

169001–169100 

|-bgcolor=#fefefe
| 169001 ||  || — || February 17, 2001 || Socorro || LINEAR || NYS || align=right | 1.4 km || 
|-id=002 bgcolor=#fefefe
| 169002 ||  || — || February 17, 2001 || Socorro || LINEAR || — || align=right | 1.8 km || 
|-id=003 bgcolor=#fefefe
| 169003 ||  || — || February 17, 2001 || Socorro || LINEAR || — || align=right | 1.5 km || 
|-id=004 bgcolor=#fefefe
| 169004 ||  || — || February 19, 2001 || Socorro || LINEAR || — || align=right | 1.7 km || 
|-id=005 bgcolor=#fefefe
| 169005 ||  || — || February 19, 2001 || Socorro || LINEAR || NYS || align=right | 1.3 km || 
|-id=006 bgcolor=#fefefe
| 169006 ||  || — || February 19, 2001 || Socorro || LINEAR || NYS || align=right | 1.0 km || 
|-id=007 bgcolor=#fefefe
| 169007 ||  || — || February 19, 2001 || Socorro || LINEAR || — || align=right | 1.6 km || 
|-id=008 bgcolor=#E9E9E9
| 169008 ||  || — || February 19, 2001 || Socorro || LINEAR || — || align=right | 3.7 km || 
|-id=009 bgcolor=#fefefe
| 169009 ||  || — || February 19, 2001 || Socorro || LINEAR || — || align=right | 1.4 km || 
|-id=010 bgcolor=#fefefe
| 169010 ||  || — || February 19, 2001 || Socorro || LINEAR || NYS || align=right | 1.2 km || 
|-id=011 bgcolor=#fefefe
| 169011 ||  || — || February 19, 2001 || Socorro || LINEAR || NYS || align=right data-sort-value="0.96" | 960 m || 
|-id=012 bgcolor=#fefefe
| 169012 ||  || — || February 19, 2001 || Socorro || LINEAR || — || align=right | 1.7 km || 
|-id=013 bgcolor=#fefefe
| 169013 ||  || — || February 20, 2001 || Socorro || LINEAR || — || align=right data-sort-value="0.96" | 960 m || 
|-id=014 bgcolor=#fefefe
| 169014 ||  || — || February 19, 2001 || Socorro || LINEAR || NYS || align=right | 1.1 km || 
|-id=015 bgcolor=#fefefe
| 169015 ||  || — || February 19, 2001 || Socorro || LINEAR || — || align=right | 1.7 km || 
|-id=016 bgcolor=#E9E9E9
| 169016 ||  || — || February 19, 2001 || Socorro || LINEAR || — || align=right | 1.9 km || 
|-id=017 bgcolor=#fefefe
| 169017 ||  || — || February 19, 2001 || Socorro || LINEAR || NYS || align=right | 1.3 km || 
|-id=018 bgcolor=#fefefe
| 169018 ||  || — || February 19, 2001 || Socorro || LINEAR || NYS || align=right | 1.0 km || 
|-id=019 bgcolor=#fefefe
| 169019 ||  || — || February 20, 2001 || Socorro || LINEAR || — || align=right | 1.0 km || 
|-id=020 bgcolor=#E9E9E9
| 169020 ||  || — || February 27, 2001 || Kitt Peak || Spacewatch || — || align=right | 1.6 km || 
|-id=021 bgcolor=#fefefe
| 169021 ||  || — || February 22, 2001 || Socorro || LINEAR || — || align=right | 1.7 km || 
|-id=022 bgcolor=#E9E9E9
| 169022 ||  || — || February 20, 2001 || Kitt Peak || Spacewatch || — || align=right | 4.4 km || 
|-id=023 bgcolor=#fefefe
| 169023 ||  || — || February 19, 2001 || Socorro || LINEAR || EUT || align=right data-sort-value="0.89" | 890 m || 
|-id=024 bgcolor=#fefefe
| 169024 ||  || — || February 17, 2001 || Socorro || LINEAR || — || align=right data-sort-value="0.97" | 970 m || 
|-id=025 bgcolor=#fefefe
| 169025 ||  || — || February 17, 2001 || Socorro || LINEAR || — || align=right | 1.4 km || 
|-id=026 bgcolor=#fefefe
| 169026 ||  || — || February 16, 2001 || Anderson Mesa || LONEOS || MAS || align=right | 1.2 km || 
|-id=027 bgcolor=#fefefe
| 169027 ||  || — || February 20, 2001 || Kitt Peak || Spacewatch || — || align=right | 1.1 km || 
|-id=028 bgcolor=#fefefe
| 169028 ||  || — || March 2, 2001 || Anderson Mesa || LONEOS || NYS || align=right | 1.1 km || 
|-id=029 bgcolor=#E9E9E9
| 169029 ||  || — || March 2, 2001 || Anderson Mesa || LONEOS || — || align=right | 2.3 km || 
|-id=030 bgcolor=#E9E9E9
| 169030 ||  || — || March 2, 2001 || Anderson Mesa || LONEOS || — || align=right | 2.8 km || 
|-id=031 bgcolor=#fefefe
| 169031 ||  || — || March 15, 2001 || Socorro || LINEAR || — || align=right | 1.9 km || 
|-id=032 bgcolor=#fefefe
| 169032 ||  || — || March 19, 2001 || Anderson Mesa || LONEOS || MAS || align=right | 1.1 km || 
|-id=033 bgcolor=#fefefe
| 169033 ||  || — || March 19, 2001 || Anderson Mesa || LONEOS || — || align=right | 1.7 km || 
|-id=034 bgcolor=#E9E9E9
| 169034 ||  || — || March 19, 2001 || Anderson Mesa || LONEOS || — || align=right | 2.4 km || 
|-id=035 bgcolor=#E9E9E9
| 169035 ||  || — || March 19, 2001 || Anderson Mesa || LONEOS || — || align=right | 2.1 km || 
|-id=036 bgcolor=#E9E9E9
| 169036 ||  || — || March 21, 2001 || Anderson Mesa || LONEOS || — || align=right | 2.5 km || 
|-id=037 bgcolor=#fefefe
| 169037 ||  || — || March 18, 2001 || Socorro || LINEAR || ERI || align=right | 2.9 km || 
|-id=038 bgcolor=#E9E9E9
| 169038 ||  || — || March 18, 2001 || Socorro || LINEAR || — || align=right | 3.1 km || 
|-id=039 bgcolor=#fefefe
| 169039 ||  || — || March 18, 2001 || Socorro || LINEAR || NYS || align=right | 1.2 km || 
|-id=040 bgcolor=#E9E9E9
| 169040 ||  || — || March 18, 2001 || Socorro || LINEAR || EUN || align=right | 2.0 km || 
|-id=041 bgcolor=#E9E9E9
| 169041 ||  || — || March 18, 2001 || Socorro || LINEAR || — || align=right | 2.0 km || 
|-id=042 bgcolor=#E9E9E9
| 169042 ||  || — || March 18, 2001 || Socorro || LINEAR || — || align=right | 2.5 km || 
|-id=043 bgcolor=#E9E9E9
| 169043 ||  || — || March 18, 2001 || Socorro || LINEAR || — || align=right | 3.8 km || 
|-id=044 bgcolor=#E9E9E9
| 169044 ||  || — || March 18, 2001 || Socorro || LINEAR || — || align=right | 1.7 km || 
|-id=045 bgcolor=#E9E9E9
| 169045 ||  || — || March 18, 2001 || Socorro || LINEAR || BAR || align=right | 2.9 km || 
|-id=046 bgcolor=#E9E9E9
| 169046 ||  || — || March 23, 2001 || Socorro || LINEAR || — || align=right | 1.6 km || 
|-id=047 bgcolor=#fefefe
| 169047 ||  || — || March 19, 2001 || Socorro || LINEAR || NYS || align=right | 1.4 km || 
|-id=048 bgcolor=#E9E9E9
| 169048 ||  || — || March 19, 2001 || Socorro || LINEAR || — || align=right | 1.5 km || 
|-id=049 bgcolor=#fefefe
| 169049 ||  || — || March 21, 2001 || Anderson Mesa || LONEOS || — || align=right | 1.3 km || 
|-id=050 bgcolor=#E9E9E9
| 169050 ||  || — || March 26, 2001 || Kitt Peak || Spacewatch || — || align=right | 2.0 km || 
|-id=051 bgcolor=#E9E9E9
| 169051 ||  || — || March 16, 2001 || Socorro || LINEAR || — || align=right | 4.8 km || 
|-id=052 bgcolor=#E9E9E9
| 169052 ||  || — || March 16, 2001 || Socorro || LINEAR || — || align=right | 1.8 km || 
|-id=053 bgcolor=#fefefe
| 169053 ||  || — || March 16, 2001 || Socorro || LINEAR || — || align=right | 1.8 km || 
|-id=054 bgcolor=#E9E9E9
| 169054 ||  || — || March 16, 2001 || Kitt Peak || Spacewatch || — || align=right | 4.2 km || 
|-id=055 bgcolor=#fefefe
| 169055 ||  || — || March 18, 2001 || Socorro || LINEAR || NYS || align=right | 1.1 km || 
|-id=056 bgcolor=#E9E9E9
| 169056 ||  || — || March 19, 2001 || Anderson Mesa || LONEOS || — || align=right | 3.2 km || 
|-id=057 bgcolor=#E9E9E9
| 169057 ||  || — || March 19, 2001 || Socorro || LINEAR || — || align=right | 2.8 km || 
|-id=058 bgcolor=#E9E9E9
| 169058 ||  || — || March 19, 2001 || Socorro || LINEAR || AER || align=right | 2.2 km || 
|-id=059 bgcolor=#E9E9E9
| 169059 ||  || — || March 29, 2001 || Anderson Mesa || LONEOS || — || align=right | 1.6 km || 
|-id=060 bgcolor=#E9E9E9
| 169060 ||  || — || March 29, 2001 || Anderson Mesa || LONEOS || — || align=right | 1.4 km || 
|-id=061 bgcolor=#E9E9E9
| 169061 ||  || — || March 26, 2001 || Socorro || LINEAR || — || align=right | 1.7 km || 
|-id=062 bgcolor=#fefefe
| 169062 ||  || — || March 21, 2001 || Anderson Mesa || LONEOS || — || align=right | 1.7 km || 
|-id=063 bgcolor=#E9E9E9
| 169063 ||  || — || March 23, 2001 || Anderson Mesa || LONEOS || — || align=right | 2.6 km || 
|-id=064 bgcolor=#fefefe
| 169064 ||  || — || March 24, 2001 || Anderson Mesa || LONEOS || — || align=right | 1.6 km || 
|-id=065 bgcolor=#fefefe
| 169065 ||  || — || March 26, 2001 || Haleakala || NEAT || — || align=right | 1.6 km || 
|-id=066 bgcolor=#fefefe
| 169066 ||  || — || March 27, 2001 || Anderson Mesa || LONEOS || ERI || align=right | 4.9 km || 
|-id=067 bgcolor=#fefefe
| 169067 ||  || — || March 19, 2001 || Socorro || LINEAR || H || align=right data-sort-value="0.88" | 880 m || 
|-id=068 bgcolor=#E9E9E9
| 169068 ||  || — || March 20, 2001 || Kitt Peak || Spacewatch || — || align=right | 1.4 km || 
|-id=069 bgcolor=#fefefe
| 169069 ||  || — || March 24, 2001 || Haleakala || NEAT || — || align=right | 1.5 km || 
|-id=070 bgcolor=#fefefe
| 169070 ||  || — || March 16, 2001 || Socorro || LINEAR || — || align=right | 1.5 km || 
|-id=071 bgcolor=#C2E0FF
| 169071 ||  || — || March 26, 2001 || Kitt Peak || M. W. Buie || plutinocritical || align=right | 111 km || 
|-id=072 bgcolor=#E9E9E9
| 169072 ||  || — || March 26, 2001 || Haleakala || NEAT || — || align=right | 4.9 km || 
|-id=073 bgcolor=#E9E9E9
| 169073 ||  || — || April 15, 2001 || Kanab || E. E. Sheridan || — || align=right | 4.3 km || 
|-id=074 bgcolor=#E9E9E9
| 169074 ||  || — || April 15, 2001 || Socorro || LINEAR || — || align=right | 2.7 km || 
|-id=075 bgcolor=#fefefe
| 169075 ||  || — || April 15, 2001 || Haleakala || NEAT || — || align=right | 2.3 km || 
|-id=076 bgcolor=#E9E9E9
| 169076 ||  || — || April 15, 2001 || Haleakala || NEAT || — || align=right | 2.9 km || 
|-id=077 bgcolor=#E9E9E9
| 169077 ||  || — || April 18, 2001 || Eskridge || G. Hug || EUN || align=right | 2.1 km || 
|-id=078 bgcolor=#E9E9E9
| 169078 Chuckshaw ||  ||  || April 23, 2001 || Kanab || E. E. Sheridan || JUN || align=right | 1.6 km || 
|-id=079 bgcolor=#E9E9E9
| 169079 ||  || — || April 21, 2001 || Kitt Peak || Spacewatch || — || align=right | 3.7 km || 
|-id=080 bgcolor=#E9E9E9
| 169080 ||  || — || April 23, 2001 || Socorro || LINEAR || — || align=right | 3.3 km || 
|-id=081 bgcolor=#E9E9E9
| 169081 ||  || — || April 27, 2001 || Socorro || LINEAR || — || align=right | 4.4 km || 
|-id=082 bgcolor=#E9E9E9
| 169082 ||  || — || April 29, 2001 || Socorro || LINEAR || — || align=right | 2.3 km || 
|-id=083 bgcolor=#E9E9E9
| 169083 ||  || — || April 29, 2001 || Kitt Peak || Spacewatch || — || align=right | 2.5 km || 
|-id=084 bgcolor=#fefefe
| 169084 ||  || — || April 21, 2001 || Socorro || LINEAR || — || align=right | 4.0 km || 
|-id=085 bgcolor=#E9E9E9
| 169085 ||  || — || April 22, 2001 || Socorro || LINEAR || — || align=right | 3.3 km || 
|-id=086 bgcolor=#E9E9E9
| 169086 ||  || — || April 24, 2001 || Kitt Peak || Spacewatch || — || align=right | 4.1 km || 
|-id=087 bgcolor=#fefefe
| 169087 ||  || — || April 23, 2001 || Socorro || LINEAR || — || align=right | 1.4 km || 
|-id=088 bgcolor=#E9E9E9
| 169088 ||  || — || May 15, 2001 || Anderson Mesa || LONEOS || — || align=right | 2.9 km || 
|-id=089 bgcolor=#E9E9E9
| 169089 ||  || — || May 15, 2001 || Anderson Mesa || LONEOS || — || align=right | 2.0 km || 
|-id=090 bgcolor=#E9E9E9
| 169090 ||  || — || May 15, 2001 || Anderson Mesa || LONEOS || — || align=right | 2.6 km || 
|-id=091 bgcolor=#E9E9E9
| 169091 ||  || — || May 18, 2001 || Socorro || LINEAR || — || align=right | 5.2 km || 
|-id=092 bgcolor=#E9E9E9
| 169092 ||  || — || May 22, 2001 || OCA-Anza || M. White, M. Collins || — || align=right | 4.9 km || 
|-id=093 bgcolor=#E9E9E9
| 169093 ||  || — || May 17, 2001 || Socorro || LINEAR || EUN || align=right | 1.8 km || 
|-id=094 bgcolor=#E9E9E9
| 169094 ||  || — || May 24, 2001 || Kitt Peak || Spacewatch || — || align=right | 3.9 km || 
|-id=095 bgcolor=#E9E9E9
| 169095 ||  || — || May 21, 2001 || Socorro || LINEAR || INO || align=right | 2.0 km || 
|-id=096 bgcolor=#E9E9E9
| 169096 ||  || — || May 24, 2001 || Socorro || LINEAR || — || align=right | 4.8 km || 
|-id=097 bgcolor=#E9E9E9
| 169097 ||  || — || May 18, 2001 || Haleakala || NEAT || — || align=right | 3.7 km || 
|-id=098 bgcolor=#E9E9E9
| 169098 ||  || — || May 26, 2001 || Socorro || LINEAR || — || align=right | 4.6 km || 
|-id=099 bgcolor=#fefefe
| 169099 ||  || — || May 18, 2001 || Haleakala || NEAT || — || align=right | 2.0 km || 
|-id=100 bgcolor=#E9E9E9
| 169100 ||  || — || May 22, 2001 || Socorro || LINEAR || — || align=right | 2.7 km || 
|}

169101–169200 

|-bgcolor=#E9E9E9
| 169101 ||  || — || May 24, 2001 || Socorro || LINEAR || — || align=right | 1.9 km || 
|-id=102 bgcolor=#E9E9E9
| 169102 ||  || — || May 26, 2001 || Socorro || LINEAR || GEF || align=right | 2.2 km || 
|-id=103 bgcolor=#E9E9E9
| 169103 ||  || — || June 13, 2001 || Socorro || LINEAR || — || align=right | 1.5 km || 
|-id=104 bgcolor=#d6d6d6
| 169104 ||  || — || July 14, 2001 || Palomar || NEAT || KOR || align=right | 2.6 km || 
|-id=105 bgcolor=#d6d6d6
| 169105 ||  || — || July 14, 2001 || Haleakala || NEAT || — || align=right | 3.9 km || 
|-id=106 bgcolor=#d6d6d6
| 169106 ||  || — || July 19, 2001 || Palomar || NEAT || CHA || align=right | 3.4 km || 
|-id=107 bgcolor=#d6d6d6
| 169107 ||  || — || July 17, 2001 || Anderson Mesa || LONEOS || — || align=right | 5.1 km || 
|-id=108 bgcolor=#d6d6d6
| 169108 ||  || — || July 17, 2001 || Palomar || NEAT || — || align=right | 3.9 km || 
|-id=109 bgcolor=#d6d6d6
| 169109 ||  || — || July 16, 2001 || Haleakala || NEAT || LIX || align=right | 7.4 km || 
|-id=110 bgcolor=#d6d6d6
| 169110 ||  || — || July 19, 2001 || Palomar || NEAT || — || align=right | 3.8 km || 
|-id=111 bgcolor=#d6d6d6
| 169111 ||  || — || July 21, 2001 || Haleakala || NEAT || — || align=right | 5.0 km || 
|-id=112 bgcolor=#d6d6d6
| 169112 ||  || — || July 22, 2001 || Palomar || NEAT || EMA || align=right | 5.1 km || 
|-id=113 bgcolor=#d6d6d6
| 169113 ||  || — || July 22, 2001 || Palomar || NEAT || EOS || align=right | 4.6 km || 
|-id=114 bgcolor=#d6d6d6
| 169114 ||  || — || July 16, 2001 || Anderson Mesa || LONEOS || — || align=right | 7.1 km || 
|-id=115 bgcolor=#d6d6d6
| 169115 ||  || — || July 21, 2001 || Haleakala || NEAT || — || align=right | 5.1 km || 
|-id=116 bgcolor=#d6d6d6
| 169116 ||  || — || July 19, 2001 || Anderson Mesa || LONEOS || — || align=right | 5.9 km || 
|-id=117 bgcolor=#d6d6d6
| 169117 ||  || — || July 29, 2001 || Socorro || LINEAR || — || align=right | 4.6 km || 
|-id=118 bgcolor=#d6d6d6
| 169118 ||  || — || July 26, 2001 || Palomar || NEAT || EOS || align=right | 2.9 km || 
|-id=119 bgcolor=#d6d6d6
| 169119 ||  || — || July 27, 2001 || Palomar || NEAT || — || align=right | 3.7 km || 
|-id=120 bgcolor=#d6d6d6
| 169120 ||  || — || August 10, 2001 || Palomar || NEAT || EOS || align=right | 3.1 km || 
|-id=121 bgcolor=#d6d6d6
| 169121 ||  || — || August 9, 2001 || Palomar || NEAT || HYG || align=right | 4.6 km || 
|-id=122 bgcolor=#d6d6d6
| 169122 ||  || — || August 11, 2001 || Haleakala || NEAT || — || align=right | 5.7 km || 
|-id=123 bgcolor=#d6d6d6
| 169123 ||  || — || August 11, 2001 || Haleakala || NEAT || HYG || align=right | 4.6 km || 
|-id=124 bgcolor=#E9E9E9
| 169124 ||  || — || August 11, 2001 || Haleakala || NEAT || GEF || align=right | 2.2 km || 
|-id=125 bgcolor=#d6d6d6
| 169125 ||  || — || August 13, 2001 || Haleakala || NEAT || — || align=right | 4.7 km || 
|-id=126 bgcolor=#d6d6d6
| 169126 ||  || — || August 10, 2001 || Palomar || NEAT || EOS || align=right | 3.1 km || 
|-id=127 bgcolor=#d6d6d6
| 169127 ||  || — || August 10, 2001 || Palomar || NEAT || — || align=right | 4.2 km || 
|-id=128 bgcolor=#d6d6d6
| 169128 ||  || — || August 10, 2001 || Palomar || NEAT || EOS || align=right | 3.8 km || 
|-id=129 bgcolor=#E9E9E9
| 169129 ||  || — || August 11, 2001 || Haleakala || NEAT || — || align=right | 4.9 km || 
|-id=130 bgcolor=#fefefe
| 169130 ||  || — || August 11, 2001 || Palomar || NEAT || H || align=right | 1.2 km || 
|-id=131 bgcolor=#d6d6d6
| 169131 ||  || — || August 13, 2001 || Palomar || NEAT || — || align=right | 3.9 km || 
|-id=132 bgcolor=#d6d6d6
| 169132 ||  || — || August 15, 2001 || Haleakala || NEAT || EOS || align=right | 3.2 km || 
|-id=133 bgcolor=#d6d6d6
| 169133 ||  || — || August 14, 2001 || Haleakala || NEAT || — || align=right | 5.2 km || 
|-id=134 bgcolor=#d6d6d6
| 169134 ||  || — || August 16, 2001 || Socorro || LINEAR || — || align=right | 5.0 km || 
|-id=135 bgcolor=#d6d6d6
| 169135 ||  || — || August 16, 2001 || Socorro || LINEAR || — || align=right | 4.7 km || 
|-id=136 bgcolor=#d6d6d6
| 169136 ||  || — || August 16, 2001 || Socorro || LINEAR || TIR || align=right | 4.4 km || 
|-id=137 bgcolor=#d6d6d6
| 169137 ||  || — || August 16, 2001 || Socorro || LINEAR || — || align=right | 8.3 km || 
|-id=138 bgcolor=#d6d6d6
| 169138 ||  || — || August 17, 2001 || Socorro || LINEAR || — || align=right | 7.5 km || 
|-id=139 bgcolor=#d6d6d6
| 169139 ||  || — || August 21, 2001 || Kitt Peak || Spacewatch || — || align=right | 3.7 km || 
|-id=140 bgcolor=#d6d6d6
| 169140 ||  || — || August 17, 2001 || Palomar || NEAT || — || align=right | 7.1 km || 
|-id=141 bgcolor=#d6d6d6
| 169141 ||  || — || August 22, 2001 || Socorro || LINEAR || — || align=right | 4.7 km || 
|-id=142 bgcolor=#d6d6d6
| 169142 ||  || — || August 25, 2001 || Anderson Mesa || LONEOS || THM || align=right | 3.7 km || 
|-id=143 bgcolor=#d6d6d6
| 169143 ||  || — || August 25, 2001 || Socorro || LINEAR || — || align=right | 5.4 km || 
|-id=144 bgcolor=#d6d6d6
| 169144 ||  || — || August 17, 2001 || Socorro || LINEAR || — || align=right | 5.0 km || 
|-id=145 bgcolor=#d6d6d6
| 169145 ||  || — || August 19, 2001 || Socorro || LINEAR || EOS || align=right | 3.5 km || 
|-id=146 bgcolor=#d6d6d6
| 169146 ||  || — || August 19, 2001 || Socorro || LINEAR || KOR || align=right | 2.6 km || 
|-id=147 bgcolor=#d6d6d6
| 169147 ||  || — || August 19, 2001 || Socorro || LINEAR || — || align=right | 5.4 km || 
|-id=148 bgcolor=#d6d6d6
| 169148 ||  || — || August 20, 2001 || Socorro || LINEAR || — || align=right | 5.6 km || 
|-id=149 bgcolor=#d6d6d6
| 169149 ||  || — || August 21, 2001 || Socorro || LINEAR || EOS || align=right | 3.8 km || 
|-id=150 bgcolor=#d6d6d6
| 169150 ||  || — || August 23, 2001 || Anderson Mesa || LONEOS || — || align=right | 4.2 km || 
|-id=151 bgcolor=#d6d6d6
| 169151 ||  || — || August 23, 2001 || Anderson Mesa || LONEOS || HYG || align=right | 5.0 km || 
|-id=152 bgcolor=#d6d6d6
| 169152 ||  || — || August 23, 2001 || Anderson Mesa || LONEOS || — || align=right | 4.9 km || 
|-id=153 bgcolor=#d6d6d6
| 169153 ||  || — || August 24, 2001 || Haleakala || NEAT || — || align=right | 5.3 km || 
|-id=154 bgcolor=#d6d6d6
| 169154 ||  || — || August 25, 2001 || Socorro || LINEAR || EOS || align=right | 3.0 km || 
|-id=155 bgcolor=#d6d6d6
| 169155 ||  || — || August 25, 2001 || Palomar || NEAT || — || align=right | 3.9 km || 
|-id=156 bgcolor=#d6d6d6
| 169156 ||  || — || August 28, 2001 || Bergisch Gladbach || W. Bickel || — || align=right | 3.7 km || 
|-id=157 bgcolor=#d6d6d6
| 169157 ||  || — || August 21, 2001 || Palomar || NEAT || — || align=right | 8.9 km || 
|-id=158 bgcolor=#d6d6d6
| 169158 ||  || — || August 21, 2001 || Haleakala || NEAT || — || align=right | 6.8 km || 
|-id=159 bgcolor=#d6d6d6
| 169159 ||  || — || August 22, 2001 || Socorro || LINEAR || — || align=right | 7.4 km || 
|-id=160 bgcolor=#E9E9E9
| 169160 ||  || — || August 22, 2001 || Socorro || LINEAR || — || align=right | 2.3 km || 
|-id=161 bgcolor=#d6d6d6
| 169161 ||  || — || August 23, 2001 || Anderson Mesa || LONEOS || — || align=right | 3.0 km || 
|-id=162 bgcolor=#d6d6d6
| 169162 ||  || — || August 23, 2001 || Anderson Mesa || LONEOS || EOS || align=right | 3.6 km || 
|-id=163 bgcolor=#d6d6d6
| 169163 ||  || — || August 23, 2001 || Anderson Mesa || LONEOS || — || align=right | 4.3 km || 
|-id=164 bgcolor=#d6d6d6
| 169164 ||  || — || August 23, 2001 || Anderson Mesa || LONEOS || — || align=right | 4.2 km || 
|-id=165 bgcolor=#d6d6d6
| 169165 ||  || — || August 23, 2001 || Anderson Mesa || LONEOS || EUP || align=right | 6.1 km || 
|-id=166 bgcolor=#d6d6d6
| 169166 ||  || — || August 23, 2001 || Anderson Mesa || LONEOS || — || align=right | 3.2 km || 
|-id=167 bgcolor=#d6d6d6
| 169167 ||  || — || August 24, 2001 || Anderson Mesa || LONEOS || — || align=right | 5.2 km || 
|-id=168 bgcolor=#d6d6d6
| 169168 ||  || — || August 24, 2001 || Anderson Mesa || LONEOS || TIR || align=right | 5.9 km || 
|-id=169 bgcolor=#d6d6d6
| 169169 ||  || — || August 24, 2001 || Anderson Mesa || LONEOS || — || align=right | 4.9 km || 
|-id=170 bgcolor=#d6d6d6
| 169170 ||  || — || August 24, 2001 || Anderson Mesa || LONEOS || — || align=right | 4.7 km || 
|-id=171 bgcolor=#d6d6d6
| 169171 ||  || — || August 24, 2001 || Anderson Mesa || LONEOS || — || align=right | 4.4 km || 
|-id=172 bgcolor=#d6d6d6
| 169172 ||  || — || August 24, 2001 || Anderson Mesa || LONEOS || — || align=right | 6.7 km || 
|-id=173 bgcolor=#d6d6d6
| 169173 ||  || — || August 24, 2001 || Socorro || LINEAR || — || align=right | 5.1 km || 
|-id=174 bgcolor=#d6d6d6
| 169174 ||  || — || August 24, 2001 || Socorro || LINEAR || HYG || align=right | 5.0 km || 
|-id=175 bgcolor=#d6d6d6
| 169175 ||  || — || August 24, 2001 || Socorro || LINEAR || THM || align=right | 4.8 km || 
|-id=176 bgcolor=#d6d6d6
| 169176 ||  || — || August 25, 2001 || Socorro || LINEAR || — || align=right | 3.8 km || 
|-id=177 bgcolor=#d6d6d6
| 169177 ||  || — || August 25, 2001 || Socorro || LINEAR || EOS || align=right | 3.2 km || 
|-id=178 bgcolor=#d6d6d6
| 169178 ||  || — || August 25, 2001 || Socorro || LINEAR || — || align=right | 5.2 km || 
|-id=179 bgcolor=#d6d6d6
| 169179 ||  || — || August 20, 2001 || Socorro || LINEAR || MEL || align=right | 5.1 km || 
|-id=180 bgcolor=#d6d6d6
| 169180 ||  || — || August 20, 2001 || Haleakala || NEAT || EOS || align=right | 3.7 km || 
|-id=181 bgcolor=#d6d6d6
| 169181 ||  || — || August 19, 2001 || Socorro || LINEAR || — || align=right | 6.6 km || 
|-id=182 bgcolor=#d6d6d6
| 169182 ||  || — || August 18, 2001 || Anderson Mesa || LONEOS || — || align=right | 5.5 km || 
|-id=183 bgcolor=#d6d6d6
| 169183 ||  || — || August 16, 2001 || Socorro || LINEAR || — || align=right | 4.4 km || 
|-id=184 bgcolor=#d6d6d6
| 169184 Jameslee ||  ||  || August 19, 2001 || Cerro Tololo || M. W. Buie || — || align=right | 4.3 km || 
|-id=185 bgcolor=#d6d6d6
| 169185 ||  || — || September 8, 2001 || Socorro || LINEAR || EUP || align=right | 7.4 km || 
|-id=186 bgcolor=#d6d6d6
| 169186 ||  || — || September 8, 2001 || Anderson Mesa || LONEOS || — || align=right | 5.4 km || 
|-id=187 bgcolor=#d6d6d6
| 169187 ||  || — || September 10, 2001 || Socorro || LINEAR || EUP || align=right | 5.9 km || 
|-id=188 bgcolor=#d6d6d6
| 169188 ||  || — || September 7, 2001 || Socorro || LINEAR || — || align=right | 5.0 km || 
|-id=189 bgcolor=#d6d6d6
| 169189 ||  || — || September 7, 2001 || Socorro || LINEAR || — || align=right | 4.2 km || 
|-id=190 bgcolor=#d6d6d6
| 169190 ||  || — || September 7, 2001 || Socorro || LINEAR || — || align=right | 5.7 km || 
|-id=191 bgcolor=#d6d6d6
| 169191 ||  || — || September 7, 2001 || Socorro || LINEAR || — || align=right | 5.0 km || 
|-id=192 bgcolor=#d6d6d6
| 169192 ||  || — || September 8, 2001 || Socorro || LINEAR || — || align=right | 4.9 km || 
|-id=193 bgcolor=#d6d6d6
| 169193 ||  || — || September 8, 2001 || Socorro || LINEAR || EOS || align=right | 3.0 km || 
|-id=194 bgcolor=#d6d6d6
| 169194 ||  || — || September 9, 2001 || Palomar || NEAT || — || align=right | 4.5 km || 
|-id=195 bgcolor=#d6d6d6
| 169195 ||  || — || September 12, 2001 || Socorro || LINEAR || — || align=right | 3.7 km || 
|-id=196 bgcolor=#d6d6d6
| 169196 ||  || — || September 12, 2001 || Socorro || LINEAR || — || align=right | 4.9 km || 
|-id=197 bgcolor=#d6d6d6
| 169197 ||  || — || September 12, 2001 || Socorro || LINEAR || — || align=right | 5.4 km || 
|-id=198 bgcolor=#d6d6d6
| 169198 ||  || — || September 10, 2001 || Socorro || LINEAR || EOS || align=right | 4.1 km || 
|-id=199 bgcolor=#d6d6d6
| 169199 ||  || — || September 10, 2001 || Socorro || LINEAR || HYG || align=right | 6.3 km || 
|-id=200 bgcolor=#d6d6d6
| 169200 ||  || — || September 10, 2001 || Socorro || LINEAR || — || align=right | 7.1 km || 
|}

169201–169300 

|-bgcolor=#d6d6d6
| 169201 ||  || — || September 11, 2001 || Anderson Mesa || LONEOS || — || align=right | 7.2 km || 
|-id=202 bgcolor=#d6d6d6
| 169202 ||  || — || September 11, 2001 || Anderson Mesa || LONEOS || TIR || align=right | 4.6 km || 
|-id=203 bgcolor=#d6d6d6
| 169203 ||  || — || September 11, 2001 || Anderson Mesa || LONEOS || — || align=right | 5.3 km || 
|-id=204 bgcolor=#d6d6d6
| 169204 ||  || — || September 11, 2001 || Anderson Mesa || LONEOS || — || align=right | 5.3 km || 
|-id=205 bgcolor=#d6d6d6
| 169205 ||  || — || September 11, 2001 || Anderson Mesa || LONEOS || EOS || align=right | 2.9 km || 
|-id=206 bgcolor=#d6d6d6
| 169206 ||  || — || September 11, 2001 || Anderson Mesa || LONEOS || — || align=right | 4.3 km || 
|-id=207 bgcolor=#d6d6d6
| 169207 ||  || — || September 11, 2001 || Kitt Peak || Spacewatch || ALA || align=right | 6.0 km || 
|-id=208 bgcolor=#d6d6d6
| 169208 ||  || — || September 12, 2001 || Socorro || LINEAR || — || align=right | 4.9 km || 
|-id=209 bgcolor=#d6d6d6
| 169209 ||  || — || September 12, 2001 || Socorro || LINEAR || — || align=right | 4.9 km || 
|-id=210 bgcolor=#d6d6d6
| 169210 ||  || — || September 12, 2001 || Socorro || LINEAR || — || align=right | 5.9 km || 
|-id=211 bgcolor=#d6d6d6
| 169211 ||  || — || September 12, 2001 || Socorro || LINEAR || — || align=right | 5.0 km || 
|-id=212 bgcolor=#d6d6d6
| 169212 ||  || — || September 12, 2001 || Socorro || LINEAR || LIX || align=right | 5.9 km || 
|-id=213 bgcolor=#d6d6d6
| 169213 ||  || — || September 12, 2001 || Socorro || LINEAR || — || align=right | 4.0 km || 
|-id=214 bgcolor=#d6d6d6
| 169214 ||  || — || September 12, 2001 || Socorro || LINEAR || — || align=right | 4.5 km || 
|-id=215 bgcolor=#d6d6d6
| 169215 ||  || — || September 12, 2001 || Socorro || LINEAR || EOS || align=right | 3.4 km || 
|-id=216 bgcolor=#d6d6d6
| 169216 ||  || — || September 12, 2001 || Socorro || LINEAR || — || align=right | 5.9 km || 
|-id=217 bgcolor=#d6d6d6
| 169217 ||  || — || September 12, 2001 || Socorro || LINEAR || — || align=right | 5.6 km || 
|-id=218 bgcolor=#d6d6d6
| 169218 ||  || — || September 12, 2001 || Socorro || LINEAR || THM || align=right | 4.2 km || 
|-id=219 bgcolor=#d6d6d6
| 169219 ||  || — || September 12, 2001 || Socorro || LINEAR || — || align=right | 4.5 km || 
|-id=220 bgcolor=#d6d6d6
| 169220 ||  || — || September 12, 2001 || Socorro || LINEAR || — || align=right | 3.2 km || 
|-id=221 bgcolor=#d6d6d6
| 169221 ||  || — || September 12, 2001 || Socorro || LINEAR || — || align=right | 3.9 km || 
|-id=222 bgcolor=#d6d6d6
| 169222 ||  || — || September 8, 2001 || Socorro || LINEAR || EOS || align=right | 3.7 km || 
|-id=223 bgcolor=#d6d6d6
| 169223 ||  || — || September 9, 2001 || Anderson Mesa || LONEOS || URS || align=right | 5.8 km || 
|-id=224 bgcolor=#d6d6d6
| 169224 ||  || — || September 10, 2001 || Anderson Mesa || LONEOS || — || align=right | 5.2 km || 
|-id=225 bgcolor=#d6d6d6
| 169225 ||  || — || September 11, 2001 || Anderson Mesa || LONEOS || — || align=right | 4.2 km || 
|-id=226 bgcolor=#d6d6d6
| 169226 ||  || — || September 18, 2001 || Kitt Peak || Spacewatch || — || align=right | 4.4 km || 
|-id=227 bgcolor=#d6d6d6
| 169227 ||  || — || September 16, 2001 || Socorro || LINEAR || EUP || align=right | 7.8 km || 
|-id=228 bgcolor=#d6d6d6
| 169228 ||  || — || September 16, 2001 || Socorro || LINEAR || — || align=right | 5.0 km || 
|-id=229 bgcolor=#d6d6d6
| 169229 ||  || — || September 16, 2001 || Socorro || LINEAR || — || align=right | 7.0 km || 
|-id=230 bgcolor=#d6d6d6
| 169230 ||  || — || September 16, 2001 || Socorro || LINEAR || — || align=right | 5.8 km || 
|-id=231 bgcolor=#d6d6d6
| 169231 ||  || — || September 16, 2001 || Socorro || LINEAR || — || align=right | 6.7 km || 
|-id=232 bgcolor=#d6d6d6
| 169232 ||  || — || September 16, 2001 || Socorro || LINEAR || — || align=right | 7.4 km || 
|-id=233 bgcolor=#d6d6d6
| 169233 ||  || — || September 16, 2001 || Socorro || LINEAR || — || align=right | 4.7 km || 
|-id=234 bgcolor=#d6d6d6
| 169234 ||  || — || September 16, 2001 || Socorro || LINEAR || KOR || align=right | 2.4 km || 
|-id=235 bgcolor=#d6d6d6
| 169235 ||  || — || September 16, 2001 || Socorro || LINEAR || KOR || align=right | 2.5 km || 
|-id=236 bgcolor=#d6d6d6
| 169236 ||  || — || September 17, 2001 || Socorro || LINEAR || THM || align=right | 4.1 km || 
|-id=237 bgcolor=#d6d6d6
| 169237 ||  || — || September 17, 2001 || Socorro || LINEAR || — || align=right | 4.2 km || 
|-id=238 bgcolor=#d6d6d6
| 169238 ||  || — || September 17, 2001 || Socorro || LINEAR || — || align=right | 6.6 km || 
|-id=239 bgcolor=#d6d6d6
| 169239 ||  || — || September 20, 2001 || Socorro || LINEAR || HYG || align=right | 4.4 km || 
|-id=240 bgcolor=#E9E9E9
| 169240 ||  || — || September 20, 2001 || Socorro || LINEAR || NEM || align=right | 3.2 km || 
|-id=241 bgcolor=#d6d6d6
| 169241 ||  || — || September 20, 2001 || Socorro || LINEAR || — || align=right | 4.4 km || 
|-id=242 bgcolor=#d6d6d6
| 169242 ||  || — || September 20, 2001 || Socorro || LINEAR || — || align=right | 3.4 km || 
|-id=243 bgcolor=#d6d6d6
| 169243 ||  || — || September 20, 2001 || Socorro || LINEAR || — || align=right | 4.1 km || 
|-id=244 bgcolor=#d6d6d6
| 169244 ||  || — || September 20, 2001 || Socorro || LINEAR || — || align=right | 3.9 km || 
|-id=245 bgcolor=#d6d6d6
| 169245 ||  || — || September 20, 2001 || Socorro || LINEAR || — || align=right | 3.9 km || 
|-id=246 bgcolor=#d6d6d6
| 169246 ||  || — || September 20, 2001 || Socorro || LINEAR || THM || align=right | 3.9 km || 
|-id=247 bgcolor=#d6d6d6
| 169247 ||  || — || September 20, 2001 || Socorro || LINEAR || HYG || align=right | 5.5 km || 
|-id=248 bgcolor=#d6d6d6
| 169248 ||  || — || September 20, 2001 || Socorro || LINEAR || EOS || align=right | 2.7 km || 
|-id=249 bgcolor=#d6d6d6
| 169249 ||  || — || September 20, 2001 || Socorro || LINEAR || — || align=right | 4.9 km || 
|-id=250 bgcolor=#d6d6d6
| 169250 ||  || — || September 20, 2001 || Socorro || LINEAR || HYG || align=right | 4.7 km || 
|-id=251 bgcolor=#d6d6d6
| 169251 ||  || — || September 20, 2001 || Desert Eagle || W. K. Y. Yeung || EOS || align=right | 3.4 km || 
|-id=252 bgcolor=#d6d6d6
| 169252 ||  || — || September 22, 2001 || Goodricke-Pigott || R. A. Tucker || HYG || align=right | 4.9 km || 
|-id=253 bgcolor=#d6d6d6
| 169253 ||  || — || September 16, 2001 || Socorro || LINEAR || — || align=right | 4.7 km || 
|-id=254 bgcolor=#d6d6d6
| 169254 ||  || — || September 16, 2001 || Socorro || LINEAR || 628 || align=right | 3.2 km || 
|-id=255 bgcolor=#d6d6d6
| 169255 ||  || — || September 16, 2001 || Socorro || LINEAR || LIX || align=right | 7.4 km || 
|-id=256 bgcolor=#d6d6d6
| 169256 ||  || — || September 17, 2001 || Socorro || LINEAR || — || align=right | 5.0 km || 
|-id=257 bgcolor=#d6d6d6
| 169257 ||  || — || September 17, 2001 || Socorro || LINEAR || — || align=right | 4.7 km || 
|-id=258 bgcolor=#d6d6d6
| 169258 ||  || — || September 17, 2001 || Socorro || LINEAR || — || align=right | 5.6 km || 
|-id=259 bgcolor=#d6d6d6
| 169259 ||  || — || September 19, 2001 || Socorro || LINEAR || THM || align=right | 3.5 km || 
|-id=260 bgcolor=#d6d6d6
| 169260 ||  || — || September 22, 2001 || Eskridge || G. Hug || HYG || align=right | 3.4 km || 
|-id=261 bgcolor=#d6d6d6
| 169261 ||  || — || September 16, 2001 || Socorro || LINEAR || — || align=right | 7.3 km || 
|-id=262 bgcolor=#d6d6d6
| 169262 ||  || — || September 16, 2001 || Socorro || LINEAR || — || align=right | 3.6 km || 
|-id=263 bgcolor=#d6d6d6
| 169263 ||  || — || September 16, 2001 || Socorro || LINEAR || HYG || align=right | 5.7 km || 
|-id=264 bgcolor=#d6d6d6
| 169264 ||  || — || September 16, 2001 || Socorro || LINEAR || — || align=right | 4.7 km || 
|-id=265 bgcolor=#d6d6d6
| 169265 ||  || — || September 16, 2001 || Socorro || LINEAR || — || align=right | 4.1 km || 
|-id=266 bgcolor=#d6d6d6
| 169266 ||  || — || September 19, 2001 || Socorro || LINEAR || — || align=right | 4.2 km || 
|-id=267 bgcolor=#d6d6d6
| 169267 ||  || — || September 19, 2001 || Socorro || LINEAR || ALA || align=right | 6.2 km || 
|-id=268 bgcolor=#d6d6d6
| 169268 ||  || — || September 19, 2001 || Socorro || LINEAR || — || align=right | 5.4 km || 
|-id=269 bgcolor=#d6d6d6
| 169269 ||  || — || September 19, 2001 || Socorro || LINEAR || — || align=right | 6.2 km || 
|-id=270 bgcolor=#d6d6d6
| 169270 ||  || — || September 19, 2001 || Socorro || LINEAR || — || align=right | 4.7 km || 
|-id=271 bgcolor=#d6d6d6
| 169271 ||  || — || September 19, 2001 || Socorro || LINEAR || — || align=right | 4.5 km || 
|-id=272 bgcolor=#d6d6d6
| 169272 ||  || — || September 19, 2001 || Socorro || LINEAR || THB || align=right | 4.9 km || 
|-id=273 bgcolor=#d6d6d6
| 169273 ||  || — || September 19, 2001 || Socorro || LINEAR || — || align=right | 4.9 km || 
|-id=274 bgcolor=#d6d6d6
| 169274 ||  || — || September 19, 2001 || Socorro || LINEAR || THM || align=right | 3.6 km || 
|-id=275 bgcolor=#d6d6d6
| 169275 ||  || — || September 19, 2001 || Socorro || LINEAR || — || align=right | 5.9 km || 
|-id=276 bgcolor=#d6d6d6
| 169276 ||  || — || September 19, 2001 || Socorro || LINEAR || — || align=right | 3.4 km || 
|-id=277 bgcolor=#d6d6d6
| 169277 ||  || — || September 19, 2001 || Socorro || LINEAR || THM || align=right | 3.2 km || 
|-id=278 bgcolor=#d6d6d6
| 169278 ||  || — || September 19, 2001 || Socorro || LINEAR || THM || align=right | 3.1 km || 
|-id=279 bgcolor=#d6d6d6
| 169279 ||  || — || September 19, 2001 || Socorro || LINEAR || — || align=right | 5.8 km || 
|-id=280 bgcolor=#d6d6d6
| 169280 ||  || — || September 19, 2001 || Socorro || LINEAR || — || align=right | 4.2 km || 
|-id=281 bgcolor=#d6d6d6
| 169281 ||  || — || September 19, 2001 || Socorro || LINEAR || — || align=right | 4.6 km || 
|-id=282 bgcolor=#d6d6d6
| 169282 ||  || — || September 19, 2001 || Socorro || LINEAR || VER || align=right | 6.4 km || 
|-id=283 bgcolor=#d6d6d6
| 169283 ||  || — || September 19, 2001 || Socorro || LINEAR || HYG || align=right | 4.8 km || 
|-id=284 bgcolor=#d6d6d6
| 169284 ||  || — || September 19, 2001 || Socorro || LINEAR || — || align=right | 4.3 km || 
|-id=285 bgcolor=#d6d6d6
| 169285 ||  || — || September 19, 2001 || Socorro || LINEAR || — || align=right | 4.7 km || 
|-id=286 bgcolor=#d6d6d6
| 169286 ||  || — || September 19, 2001 || Socorro || LINEAR || LIX || align=right | 6.3 km || 
|-id=287 bgcolor=#d6d6d6
| 169287 ||  || — || September 25, 2001 || Desert Eagle || W. K. Y. Yeung || — || align=right | 3.8 km || 
|-id=288 bgcolor=#d6d6d6
| 169288 ||  || — || September 29, 2001 || Palomar || NEAT || — || align=right | 5.9 km || 
|-id=289 bgcolor=#d6d6d6
| 169289 ||  || — || September 20, 2001 || Socorro || LINEAR || — || align=right | 4.7 km || 
|-id=290 bgcolor=#d6d6d6
| 169290 ||  || — || September 20, 2001 || Socorro || LINEAR || — || align=right | 4.0 km || 
|-id=291 bgcolor=#d6d6d6
| 169291 ||  || — || September 20, 2001 || Socorro || LINEAR || KOR || align=right | 2.1 km || 
|-id=292 bgcolor=#d6d6d6
| 169292 ||  || — || September 20, 2001 || Socorro || LINEAR || — || align=right | 3.7 km || 
|-id=293 bgcolor=#d6d6d6
| 169293 ||  || — || September 23, 2001 || Socorro || LINEAR || — || align=right | 5.6 km || 
|-id=294 bgcolor=#d6d6d6
| 169294 ||  || — || September 25, 2001 || Socorro || LINEAR || — || align=right | 6.2 km || 
|-id=295 bgcolor=#d6d6d6
| 169295 ||  || — || September 16, 2001 || Socorro || LINEAR || EOS || align=right | 3.7 km || 
|-id=296 bgcolor=#d6d6d6
| 169296 ||  || — || September 19, 2001 || Kitt Peak || Spacewatch || — || align=right | 3.3 km || 
|-id=297 bgcolor=#d6d6d6
| 169297 ||  || — || September 19, 2001 || Anderson Mesa || LONEOS || URS || align=right | 5.9 km || 
|-id=298 bgcolor=#d6d6d6
| 169298 ||  || — || September 19, 2001 || Anderson Mesa || LONEOS || — || align=right | 4.8 km || 
|-id=299 bgcolor=#d6d6d6
| 169299 Sirko ||  ||  || September 21, 2001 || Apache Point || SDSS || EOS || align=right | 5.6 km || 
|-id=300 bgcolor=#d6d6d6
| 169300 ||  || — || September 21, 2001 || Socorro || LINEAR || — || align=right | 4.0 km || 
|}

169301–169400 

|-bgcolor=#d6d6d6
| 169301 ||  || — || October 6, 2001 || Palomar || NEAT || — || align=right | 4.1 km || 
|-id=302 bgcolor=#d6d6d6
| 169302 ||  || — || October 7, 2001 || Palomar || NEAT || — || align=right | 4.8 km || 
|-id=303 bgcolor=#d6d6d6
| 169303 ||  || — || October 13, 2001 || Socorro || LINEAR || — || align=right | 6.2 km || 
|-id=304 bgcolor=#d6d6d6
| 169304 ||  || — || October 13, 2001 || Socorro || LINEAR || — || align=right | 3.7 km || 
|-id=305 bgcolor=#d6d6d6
| 169305 ||  || — || October 15, 2001 || Desert Eagle || W. K. Y. Yeung || — || align=right | 5.0 km || 
|-id=306 bgcolor=#d6d6d6
| 169306 ||  || — || October 13, 2001 || Socorro || LINEAR || — || align=right | 5.4 km || 
|-id=307 bgcolor=#d6d6d6
| 169307 ||  || — || October 13, 2001 || Socorro || LINEAR || — || align=right | 4.7 km || 
|-id=308 bgcolor=#d6d6d6
| 169308 ||  || — || October 13, 2001 || Socorro || LINEAR || — || align=right | 4.7 km || 
|-id=309 bgcolor=#d6d6d6
| 169309 ||  || — || October 14, 2001 || Socorro || LINEAR || — || align=right | 3.8 km || 
|-id=310 bgcolor=#d6d6d6
| 169310 ||  || — || October 14, 2001 || Socorro || LINEAR || HYG || align=right | 5.9 km || 
|-id=311 bgcolor=#d6d6d6
| 169311 ||  || — || October 14, 2001 || Socorro || LINEAR || — || align=right | 5.6 km || 
|-id=312 bgcolor=#d6d6d6
| 169312 ||  || — || October 14, 2001 || Socorro || LINEAR || — || align=right | 5.0 km || 
|-id=313 bgcolor=#d6d6d6
| 169313 ||  || — || October 13, 2001 || Socorro || LINEAR || THB || align=right | 5.9 km || 
|-id=314 bgcolor=#d6d6d6
| 169314 ||  || — || October 14, 2001 || Socorro || LINEAR || VER || align=right | 5.2 km || 
|-id=315 bgcolor=#d6d6d6
| 169315 ||  || — || October 14, 2001 || Socorro || LINEAR || HYG || align=right | 6.1 km || 
|-id=316 bgcolor=#d6d6d6
| 169316 ||  || — || October 15, 2001 || Socorro || LINEAR || — || align=right | 7.8 km || 
|-id=317 bgcolor=#d6d6d6
| 169317 ||  || — || October 12, 2001 || Haleakala || NEAT || — || align=right | 5.5 km || 
|-id=318 bgcolor=#d6d6d6
| 169318 ||  || — || October 11, 2001 || Palomar || NEAT || URS || align=right | 4.3 km || 
|-id=319 bgcolor=#d6d6d6
| 169319 ||  || — || October 12, 2001 || Haleakala || NEAT || — || align=right | 5.9 km || 
|-id=320 bgcolor=#d6d6d6
| 169320 ||  || — || October 14, 2001 || Haleakala || NEAT || EUP || align=right | 7.7 km || 
|-id=321 bgcolor=#d6d6d6
| 169321 ||  || — || October 10, 2001 || Palomar || NEAT || — || align=right | 4.6 km || 
|-id=322 bgcolor=#d6d6d6
| 169322 ||  || — || October 10, 2001 || Palomar || NEAT || — || align=right | 6.4 km || 
|-id=323 bgcolor=#d6d6d6
| 169323 ||  || — || October 10, 2001 || Palomar || NEAT || ALA || align=right | 6.3 km || 
|-id=324 bgcolor=#d6d6d6
| 169324 ||  || — || October 10, 2001 || Palomar || NEAT || — || align=right | 4.8 km || 
|-id=325 bgcolor=#d6d6d6
| 169325 ||  || — || October 10, 2001 || Palomar || NEAT || HYG || align=right | 4.2 km || 
|-id=326 bgcolor=#d6d6d6
| 169326 ||  || — || October 10, 2001 || Palomar || NEAT || — || align=right | 6.1 km || 
|-id=327 bgcolor=#d6d6d6
| 169327 ||  || — || October 15, 2001 || Palomar || NEAT || — || align=right | 4.4 km || 
|-id=328 bgcolor=#d6d6d6
| 169328 ||  || — || October 14, 2001 || Kitt Peak || Spacewatch || THM || align=right | 2.8 km || 
|-id=329 bgcolor=#d6d6d6
| 169329 ||  || — || October 13, 2001 || Palomar || NEAT || — || align=right | 7.0 km || 
|-id=330 bgcolor=#d6d6d6
| 169330 ||  || — || October 11, 2001 || Palomar || NEAT || — || align=right | 3.9 km || 
|-id=331 bgcolor=#d6d6d6
| 169331 ||  || — || October 15, 2001 || Haleakala || NEAT || — || align=right | 3.8 km || 
|-id=332 bgcolor=#d6d6d6
| 169332 ||  || — || October 15, 2001 || Socorro || LINEAR || — || align=right | 4.7 km || 
|-id=333 bgcolor=#d6d6d6
| 169333 ||  || — || October 13, 2001 || Socorro || LINEAR || — || align=right | 5.6 km || 
|-id=334 bgcolor=#d6d6d6
| 169334 ||  || — || October 14, 2001 || Socorro || LINEAR || — || align=right | 4.0 km || 
|-id=335 bgcolor=#d6d6d6
| 169335 ||  || — || October 14, 2001 || Socorro || LINEAR || — || align=right | 5.4 km || 
|-id=336 bgcolor=#d6d6d6
| 169336 ||  || — || October 14, 2001 || Socorro || LINEAR || — || align=right | 6.9 km || 
|-id=337 bgcolor=#d6d6d6
| 169337 ||  || — || October 14, 2001 || Socorro || LINEAR || EOS || align=right | 3.1 km || 
|-id=338 bgcolor=#d6d6d6
| 169338 ||  || — || October 14, 2001 || Socorro || LINEAR || VER || align=right | 4.6 km || 
|-id=339 bgcolor=#d6d6d6
| 169339 ||  || — || October 14, 2001 || Socorro || LINEAR || HYG || align=right | 6.6 km || 
|-id=340 bgcolor=#d6d6d6
| 169340 ||  || — || October 15, 2001 || Socorro || LINEAR || — || align=right | 4.4 km || 
|-id=341 bgcolor=#d6d6d6
| 169341 ||  || — || October 11, 2001 || Socorro || LINEAR || URS || align=right | 6.3 km || 
|-id=342 bgcolor=#d6d6d6
| 169342 ||  || — || October 11, 2001 || Socorro || LINEAR || — || align=right | 5.2 km || 
|-id=343 bgcolor=#d6d6d6
| 169343 ||  || — || October 11, 2001 || Socorro || LINEAR || EOS || align=right | 3.4 km || 
|-id=344 bgcolor=#d6d6d6
| 169344 ||  || — || October 11, 2001 || Palomar || NEAT || THM || align=right | 2.8 km || 
|-id=345 bgcolor=#d6d6d6
| 169345 ||  || — || October 13, 2001 || Socorro || LINEAR || URS || align=right | 6.5 km || 
|-id=346 bgcolor=#d6d6d6
| 169346 ||  || — || October 14, 2001 || Socorro || LINEAR || HYG || align=right | 3.9 km || 
|-id=347 bgcolor=#d6d6d6
| 169347 ||  || — || October 15, 2001 || Haleakala || NEAT || — || align=right | 5.4 km || 
|-id=348 bgcolor=#d6d6d6
| 169348 ||  || — || October 15, 2001 || Palomar || NEAT || — || align=right | 5.0 km || 
|-id=349 bgcolor=#d6d6d6
| 169349 ||  || — || October 10, 2001 || Palomar || NEAT || HYG || align=right | 4.4 km || 
|-id=350 bgcolor=#d6d6d6
| 169350 ||  || — || October 21, 2001 || Desert Eagle || W. K. Y. Yeung || — || align=right | 6.5 km || 
|-id=351 bgcolor=#d6d6d6
| 169351 ||  || — || October 17, 2001 || Socorro || LINEAR || — || align=right | 5.2 km || 
|-id=352 bgcolor=#FFC2E0
| 169352 ||  || — || October 23, 2001 || Socorro || LINEAR || APO || align=right data-sort-value="0.32" | 320 m || 
|-id=353 bgcolor=#d6d6d6
| 169353 ||  || — || October 24, 2001 || Desert Eagle || W. K. Y. Yeung || — || align=right | 7.5 km || 
|-id=354 bgcolor=#d6d6d6
| 169354 ||  || — || October 18, 2001 || Socorro || LINEAR || — || align=right | 6.3 km || 
|-id=355 bgcolor=#d6d6d6
| 169355 ||  || — || October 16, 2001 || Socorro || LINEAR || — || align=right | 7.4 km || 
|-id=356 bgcolor=#d6d6d6
| 169356 ||  || — || October 17, 2001 || Socorro || LINEAR || LIX || align=right | 6.4 km || 
|-id=357 bgcolor=#d6d6d6
| 169357 ||  || — || October 17, 2001 || Socorro || LINEAR || — || align=right | 4.6 km || 
|-id=358 bgcolor=#d6d6d6
| 169358 ||  || — || October 17, 2001 || Socorro || LINEAR || — || align=right | 5.8 km || 
|-id=359 bgcolor=#d6d6d6
| 169359 ||  || — || October 17, 2001 || Socorro || LINEAR || URS || align=right | 7.5 km || 
|-id=360 bgcolor=#d6d6d6
| 169360 ||  || — || October 18, 2001 || Socorro || LINEAR || MEL || align=right | 6.5 km || 
|-id=361 bgcolor=#d6d6d6
| 169361 ||  || — || October 17, 2001 || Socorro || LINEAR || — || align=right | 5.7 km || 
|-id=362 bgcolor=#d6d6d6
| 169362 ||  || — || October 21, 2001 || Socorro || LINEAR || — || align=right | 5.4 km || 
|-id=363 bgcolor=#d6d6d6
| 169363 ||  || — || October 16, 2001 || Kitt Peak || Spacewatch || THM || align=right | 2.5 km || 
|-id=364 bgcolor=#d6d6d6
| 169364 ||  || — || October 22, 2001 || Palomar || NEAT || — || align=right | 5.6 km || 
|-id=365 bgcolor=#d6d6d6
| 169365 ||  || — || October 17, 2001 || Socorro || LINEAR || — || align=right | 4.2 km || 
|-id=366 bgcolor=#d6d6d6
| 169366 ||  || — || October 20, 2001 || Socorro || LINEAR || — || align=right | 3.8 km || 
|-id=367 bgcolor=#d6d6d6
| 169367 ||  || — || October 20, 2001 || Socorro || LINEAR || — || align=right | 4.1 km || 
|-id=368 bgcolor=#d6d6d6
| 169368 ||  || — || October 21, 2001 || Socorro || LINEAR || — || align=right | 7.1 km || 
|-id=369 bgcolor=#d6d6d6
| 169369 ||  || — || October 21, 2001 || Socorro || LINEAR || HYG || align=right | 5.5 km || 
|-id=370 bgcolor=#d6d6d6
| 169370 ||  || — || October 23, 2001 || Palomar || NEAT || — || align=right | 3.7 km || 
|-id=371 bgcolor=#d6d6d6
| 169371 ||  || — || October 23, 2001 || Socorro || LINEAR || HYG || align=right | 5.6 km || 
|-id=372 bgcolor=#d6d6d6
| 169372 ||  || — || October 23, 2001 || Socorro || LINEAR || — || align=right | 4.2 km || 
|-id=373 bgcolor=#d6d6d6
| 169373 ||  || — || October 23, 2001 || Socorro || LINEAR || — || align=right | 8.3 km || 
|-id=374 bgcolor=#d6d6d6
| 169374 ||  || — || October 23, 2001 || Socorro || LINEAR || LIX || align=right | 7.5 km || 
|-id=375 bgcolor=#d6d6d6
| 169375 ||  || — || October 18, 2001 || Palomar || NEAT || THM || align=right | 3.3 km || 
|-id=376 bgcolor=#d6d6d6
| 169376 ||  || — || October 18, 2001 || Palomar || NEAT || VER || align=right | 5.5 km || 
|-id=377 bgcolor=#d6d6d6
| 169377 ||  || — || October 24, 2001 || Palomar || NEAT || — || align=right | 6.2 km || 
|-id=378 bgcolor=#d6d6d6
| 169378 ||  || — || October 16, 2001 || Socorro || LINEAR || — || align=right | 5.2 km || 
|-id=379 bgcolor=#d6d6d6
| 169379 ||  || — || October 18, 2001 || Socorro || LINEAR || — || align=right | 6.2 km || 
|-id=380 bgcolor=#d6d6d6
| 169380 ||  || — || October 18, 2001 || Socorro || LINEAR || — || align=right | 4.8 km || 
|-id=381 bgcolor=#d6d6d6
| 169381 ||  || — || October 19, 2001 || Palomar || NEAT || 3:2 || align=right | 6.6 km || 
|-id=382 bgcolor=#d6d6d6
| 169382 ||  || — || October 20, 2001 || Palomar || NEAT || EOS || align=right | 3.4 km || 
|-id=383 bgcolor=#d6d6d6
| 169383 ||  || — || November 9, 2001 || Socorro || LINEAR || — || align=right | 4.4 km || 
|-id=384 bgcolor=#fefefe
| 169384 ||  || — || November 9, 2001 || Socorro || LINEAR || — || align=right | 1.1 km || 
|-id=385 bgcolor=#d6d6d6
| 169385 ||  || — || November 9, 2001 || Socorro || LINEAR || — || align=right | 4.9 km || 
|-id=386 bgcolor=#d6d6d6
| 169386 ||  || — || November 9, 2001 || Socorro || LINEAR || — || align=right | 4.7 km || 
|-id=387 bgcolor=#d6d6d6
| 169387 ||  || — || November 9, 2001 || Socorro || LINEAR || 7:4 || align=right | 6.7 km || 
|-id=388 bgcolor=#d6d6d6
| 169388 ||  || — || November 9, 2001 || Socorro || LINEAR || — || align=right | 6.5 km || 
|-id=389 bgcolor=#d6d6d6
| 169389 ||  || — || November 10, 2001 || Socorro || LINEAR || EOS || align=right | 5.0 km || 
|-id=390 bgcolor=#d6d6d6
| 169390 ||  || — || November 10, 2001 || Socorro || LINEAR || EOS || align=right | 3.6 km || 
|-id=391 bgcolor=#d6d6d6
| 169391 ||  || — || November 10, 2001 || Socorro || LINEAR || HYG || align=right | 4.4 km || 
|-id=392 bgcolor=#d6d6d6
| 169392 ||  || — || November 10, 2001 || Socorro || LINEAR || — || align=right | 6.0 km || 
|-id=393 bgcolor=#d6d6d6
| 169393 ||  || — || November 15, 2001 || Socorro || LINEAR || — || align=right | 6.0 km || 
|-id=394 bgcolor=#d6d6d6
| 169394 ||  || — || November 15, 2001 || Socorro || LINEAR || — || align=right | 8.1 km || 
|-id=395 bgcolor=#d6d6d6
| 169395 ||  || — || November 15, 2001 || Socorro || LINEAR || TIR || align=right | 4.5 km || 
|-id=396 bgcolor=#d6d6d6
| 169396 ||  || — || November 12, 2001 || Socorro || LINEAR || — || align=right | 4.5 km || 
|-id=397 bgcolor=#d6d6d6
| 169397 ||  || — || November 12, 2001 || Socorro || LINEAR || LIX || align=right | 7.2 km || 
|-id=398 bgcolor=#d6d6d6
| 169398 ||  || — || November 12, 2001 || Socorro || LINEAR || VER || align=right | 5.9 km || 
|-id=399 bgcolor=#fefefe
| 169399 || 2001 WX || — || November 16, 2001 || Kitt Peak || Spacewatch || — || align=right | 1.3 km || 
|-id=400 bgcolor=#d6d6d6
| 169400 ||  || — || November 17, 2001 || Socorro || LINEAR || MEL || align=right | 6.9 km || 
|}

169401–169500 

|-bgcolor=#d6d6d6
| 169401 ||  || — || November 17, 2001 || Socorro || LINEAR || — || align=right | 6.6 km || 
|-id=402 bgcolor=#d6d6d6
| 169402 ||  || — || November 20, 2001 || Socorro || LINEAR || — || align=right | 3.4 km || 
|-id=403 bgcolor=#d6d6d6
| 169403 ||  || — || November 21, 2001 || Socorro || LINEAR || — || align=right | 6.2 km || 
|-id=404 bgcolor=#d6d6d6
| 169404 ||  || — || December 10, 2001 || Socorro || LINEAR || SYL7:4 || align=right | 6.4 km || 
|-id=405 bgcolor=#d6d6d6
| 169405 ||  || — || December 9, 2001 || Socorro || LINEAR || LIX || align=right | 8.6 km || 
|-id=406 bgcolor=#d6d6d6
| 169406 ||  || — || December 9, 2001 || Socorro || LINEAR || — || align=right | 9.9 km || 
|-id=407 bgcolor=#d6d6d6
| 169407 ||  || — || December 10, 2001 || Socorro || LINEAR || — || align=right | 4.4 km || 
|-id=408 bgcolor=#d6d6d6
| 169408 ||  || — || December 10, 2001 || Socorro || LINEAR || — || align=right | 6.7 km || 
|-id=409 bgcolor=#d6d6d6
| 169409 ||  || — || December 11, 2001 || Socorro || LINEAR || — || align=right | 5.0 km || 
|-id=410 bgcolor=#d6d6d6
| 169410 ||  || — || December 14, 2001 || Socorro || LINEAR || LUT || align=right | 6.1 km || 
|-id=411 bgcolor=#d6d6d6
| 169411 ||  || — || December 14, 2001 || Socorro || LINEAR || — || align=right | 4.2 km || 
|-id=412 bgcolor=#fefefe
| 169412 ||  || — || December 14, 2001 || Socorro || LINEAR || FLO || align=right | 1.1 km || 
|-id=413 bgcolor=#fefefe
| 169413 ||  || — || December 14, 2001 || Socorro || LINEAR || — || align=right | 1.3 km || 
|-id=414 bgcolor=#fefefe
| 169414 ||  || — || December 14, 2001 || Socorro || LINEAR || — || align=right | 1.8 km || 
|-id=415 bgcolor=#d6d6d6
| 169415 ||  || — || December 15, 2001 || Socorro || LINEAR || 7:4 || align=right | 6.4 km || 
|-id=416 bgcolor=#fefefe
| 169416 ||  || — || December 14, 2001 || Bergisch Gladbach || W. Bickel || — || align=right | 1.1 km || 
|-id=417 bgcolor=#d6d6d6
| 169417 ||  || — || December 11, 2001 || Socorro || LINEAR || — || align=right | 5.0 km || 
|-id=418 bgcolor=#d6d6d6
| 169418 ||  || — || December 11, 2001 || Socorro || LINEAR || EUP || align=right | 5.7 km || 
|-id=419 bgcolor=#d6d6d6
| 169419 ||  || — || December 15, 2001 || Socorro || LINEAR || EOS || align=right | 3.2 km || 
|-id=420 bgcolor=#fefefe
| 169420 ||  || — || December 14, 2001 || Socorro || LINEAR || — || align=right | 1.6 km || 
|-id=421 bgcolor=#d6d6d6
| 169421 ||  || — || December 14, 2001 || Socorro || LINEAR || THM || align=right | 3.2 km || 
|-id=422 bgcolor=#d6d6d6
| 169422 ||  || — || December 8, 2001 || Anderson Mesa || LONEOS || — || align=right | 5.8 km || 
|-id=423 bgcolor=#fefefe
| 169423 ||  || — || December 18, 2001 || Socorro || LINEAR || — || align=right | 1.4 km || 
|-id=424 bgcolor=#d6d6d6
| 169424 ||  || — || December 18, 2001 || Socorro || LINEAR || THM || align=right | 6.1 km || 
|-id=425 bgcolor=#fefefe
| 169425 ||  || — || December 18, 2001 || Socorro || LINEAR || — || align=right data-sort-value="0.89" | 890 m || 
|-id=426 bgcolor=#fefefe
| 169426 ||  || — || December 18, 2001 || Socorro || LINEAR || — || align=right | 1.1 km || 
|-id=427 bgcolor=#fefefe
| 169427 ||  || — || December 17, 2001 || Socorro || LINEAR || — || align=right | 1.5 km || 
|-id=428 bgcolor=#d6d6d6
| 169428 ||  || — || December 17, 2001 || Socorro || LINEAR || HYG || align=right | 5.4 km || 
|-id=429 bgcolor=#d6d6d6
| 169429 ||  || — || December 19, 2001 || Palomar || NEAT || SYL7:4 || align=right | 6.5 km || 
|-id=430 bgcolor=#fefefe
| 169430 ||  || — || January 9, 2002 || Oizumi || T. Kobayashi || — || align=right | 1.5 km || 
|-id=431 bgcolor=#fefefe
| 169431 ||  || — || January 11, 2002 || Kitt Peak || Spacewatch || — || align=right | 1.2 km || 
|-id=432 bgcolor=#fefefe
| 169432 ||  || — || January 9, 2002 || Socorro || LINEAR || — || align=right | 1.2 km || 
|-id=433 bgcolor=#d6d6d6
| 169433 ||  || — || January 9, 2002 || Socorro || LINEAR || HYG || align=right | 3.8 km || 
|-id=434 bgcolor=#fefefe
| 169434 ||  || — || January 9, 2002 || Socorro || LINEAR || — || align=right | 1.8 km || 
|-id=435 bgcolor=#fefefe
| 169435 ||  || — || January 9, 2002 || Socorro || LINEAR || — || align=right | 1.1 km || 
|-id=436 bgcolor=#fefefe
| 169436 ||  || — || January 11, 2002 || Socorro || LINEAR || — || align=right | 1.5 km || 
|-id=437 bgcolor=#fefefe
| 169437 ||  || — || January 12, 2002 || Socorro || LINEAR || — || align=right | 1.4 km || 
|-id=438 bgcolor=#fefefe
| 169438 ||  || — || January 8, 2002 || Socorro || LINEAR || FLO || align=right | 1.1 km || 
|-id=439 bgcolor=#d6d6d6
| 169439 ||  || — || January 9, 2002 || Socorro || LINEAR || — || align=right | 5.2 km || 
|-id=440 bgcolor=#fefefe
| 169440 ||  || — || January 13, 2002 || Socorro || LINEAR || — || align=right | 1.1 km || 
|-id=441 bgcolor=#d6d6d6
| 169441 ||  || — || January 8, 2002 || Socorro || LINEAR || ALA || align=right | 6.4 km || 
|-id=442 bgcolor=#fefefe
| 169442 ||  || — || January 14, 2002 || Socorro || LINEAR || — || align=right | 1.3 km || 
|-id=443 bgcolor=#fefefe
| 169443 ||  || — || January 13, 2002 || Socorro || LINEAR || — || align=right | 2.8 km || 
|-id=444 bgcolor=#fefefe
| 169444 ||  || — || January 13, 2002 || Socorro || LINEAR || NYS || align=right | 2.2 km || 
|-id=445 bgcolor=#fefefe
| 169445 ||  || — || January 14, 2002 || Socorro || LINEAR || — || align=right | 2.6 km || 
|-id=446 bgcolor=#d6d6d6
| 169446 ||  || — || January 12, 2002 || Palomar || NEAT || — || align=right | 6.4 km || 
|-id=447 bgcolor=#fefefe
| 169447 || 2002 BW || — || January 21, 2002 || Palomar || NEAT || — || align=right | 1.4 km || 
|-id=448 bgcolor=#fefefe
| 169448 ||  || — || January 19, 2002 || Socorro || LINEAR || — || align=right | 1.2 km || 
|-id=449 bgcolor=#fefefe
| 169449 ||  || — || January 19, 2002 || Socorro || LINEAR || FLO || align=right | 1.1 km || 
|-id=450 bgcolor=#fefefe
| 169450 ||  || — || January 19, 2002 || Socorro || LINEAR || — || align=right | 1.4 km || 
|-id=451 bgcolor=#fefefe
| 169451 ||  || — || January 21, 2002 || Socorro || LINEAR || — || align=right | 1.4 km || 
|-id=452 bgcolor=#fefefe
| 169452 ||  || — || February 4, 2002 || Haleakala || NEAT || — || align=right | 1.4 km || 
|-id=453 bgcolor=#fefefe
| 169453 ||  || — || February 4, 2002 || Palomar || NEAT || — || align=right | 1.5 km || 
|-id=454 bgcolor=#fefefe
| 169454 ||  || — || February 6, 2002 || Socorro || LINEAR || PHO || align=right | 2.4 km || 
|-id=455 bgcolor=#fefefe
| 169455 ||  || — || February 8, 2002 || Desert Eagle || W. K. Y. Yeung || — || align=right | 1.4 km || 
|-id=456 bgcolor=#d6d6d6
| 169456 ||  || — || February 5, 2002 || Palomar || NEAT || 3:2 || align=right | 6.3 km || 
|-id=457 bgcolor=#fefefe
| 169457 ||  || — || February 6, 2002 || Socorro || LINEAR || — || align=right | 1.2 km || 
|-id=458 bgcolor=#fefefe
| 169458 ||  || — || February 7, 2002 || Socorro || LINEAR || — || align=right | 1.1 km || 
|-id=459 bgcolor=#fefefe
| 169459 ||  || — || February 7, 2002 || Socorro || LINEAR || FLO || align=right | 1.2 km || 
|-id=460 bgcolor=#fefefe
| 169460 ||  || — || February 3, 2002 || Haleakala || NEAT || — || align=right | 1.3 km || 
|-id=461 bgcolor=#fefefe
| 169461 ||  || — || February 8, 2002 || Socorro || LINEAR || — || align=right | 1.3 km || 
|-id=462 bgcolor=#fefefe
| 169462 ||  || — || February 12, 2002 || Desert Eagle || W. K. Y. Yeung || NYS || align=right | 1.1 km || 
|-id=463 bgcolor=#fefefe
| 169463 ||  || — || February 6, 2002 || Socorro || LINEAR || — || align=right | 1.4 km || 
|-id=464 bgcolor=#fefefe
| 169464 ||  || — || February 7, 2002 || Socorro || LINEAR || — || align=right | 1.4 km || 
|-id=465 bgcolor=#fefefe
| 169465 ||  || — || February 7, 2002 || Socorro || LINEAR || — || align=right data-sort-value="0.96" | 960 m || 
|-id=466 bgcolor=#fefefe
| 169466 ||  || — || February 7, 2002 || Socorro || LINEAR || FLO || align=right | 1.4 km || 
|-id=467 bgcolor=#fefefe
| 169467 ||  || — || February 7, 2002 || Socorro || LINEAR || V || align=right | 1.1 km || 
|-id=468 bgcolor=#fefefe
| 169468 ||  || — || February 7, 2002 || Socorro || LINEAR || V || align=right | 1.2 km || 
|-id=469 bgcolor=#fefefe
| 169469 ||  || — || February 7, 2002 || Socorro || LINEAR || — || align=right | 1.4 km || 
|-id=470 bgcolor=#fefefe
| 169470 ||  || — || February 7, 2002 || Socorro || LINEAR || — || align=right | 1.3 km || 
|-id=471 bgcolor=#fefefe
| 169471 ||  || — || February 7, 2002 || Socorro || LINEAR || — || align=right | 1.6 km || 
|-id=472 bgcolor=#fefefe
| 169472 ||  || — || February 7, 2002 || Socorro || LINEAR || — || align=right | 1.6 km || 
|-id=473 bgcolor=#fefefe
| 169473 ||  || — || February 7, 2002 || Socorro || LINEAR || — || align=right | 1.4 km || 
|-id=474 bgcolor=#fefefe
| 169474 ||  || — || February 7, 2002 || Socorro || LINEAR || FLO || align=right | 1.0 km || 
|-id=475 bgcolor=#fefefe
| 169475 ||  || — || February 8, 2002 || Socorro || LINEAR || — || align=right | 1.5 km || 
|-id=476 bgcolor=#fefefe
| 169476 ||  || — || February 9, 2002 || Socorro || LINEAR || V || align=right | 1.1 km || 
|-id=477 bgcolor=#d6d6d6
| 169477 ||  || — || February 7, 2002 || Socorro || LINEAR || EUP || align=right | 8.1 km || 
|-id=478 bgcolor=#fefefe
| 169478 ||  || — || February 7, 2002 || Socorro || LINEAR || — || align=right | 1.1 km || 
|-id=479 bgcolor=#fefefe
| 169479 ||  || — || February 7, 2002 || Socorro || LINEAR || — || align=right | 1.2 km || 
|-id=480 bgcolor=#fefefe
| 169480 ||  || — || February 8, 2002 || Socorro || LINEAR || — || align=right | 1.5 km || 
|-id=481 bgcolor=#fefefe
| 169481 ||  || — || February 8, 2002 || Socorro || LINEAR || V || align=right | 1.3 km || 
|-id=482 bgcolor=#fefefe
| 169482 ||  || — || February 9, 2002 || Socorro || LINEAR || — || align=right | 1.3 km || 
|-id=483 bgcolor=#fefefe
| 169483 ||  || — || February 9, 2002 || Socorro || LINEAR || — || align=right | 1.3 km || 
|-id=484 bgcolor=#fefefe
| 169484 ||  || — || February 10, 2002 || Socorro || LINEAR || FLO || align=right | 1.6 km || 
|-id=485 bgcolor=#fefefe
| 169485 ||  || — || February 7, 2002 || Socorro || LINEAR || — || align=right | 1.1 km || 
|-id=486 bgcolor=#fefefe
| 169486 ||  || — || February 8, 2002 || Socorro || LINEAR || — || align=right | 1.3 km || 
|-id=487 bgcolor=#fefefe
| 169487 ||  || — || February 8, 2002 || Socorro || LINEAR || — || align=right | 1.3 km || 
|-id=488 bgcolor=#fefefe
| 169488 ||  || — || February 8, 2002 || Socorro || LINEAR || FLO || align=right | 1.3 km || 
|-id=489 bgcolor=#fefefe
| 169489 ||  || — || February 8, 2002 || Socorro || LINEAR || — || align=right | 4.3 km || 
|-id=490 bgcolor=#fefefe
| 169490 ||  || — || February 10, 2002 || Socorro || LINEAR || — || align=right | 1.1 km || 
|-id=491 bgcolor=#fefefe
| 169491 ||  || — || February 10, 2002 || Socorro || LINEAR || — || align=right | 1.2 km || 
|-id=492 bgcolor=#fefefe
| 169492 ||  || — || February 10, 2002 || Socorro || LINEAR || FLO || align=right | 1.1 km || 
|-id=493 bgcolor=#fefefe
| 169493 ||  || — || February 10, 2002 || Socorro || LINEAR || — || align=right | 1.1 km || 
|-id=494 bgcolor=#fefefe
| 169494 ||  || — || February 10, 2002 || Socorro || LINEAR || V || align=right | 1.0 km || 
|-id=495 bgcolor=#fefefe
| 169495 ||  || — || February 10, 2002 || Socorro || LINEAR || — || align=right | 1.5 km || 
|-id=496 bgcolor=#fefefe
| 169496 ||  || — || February 10, 2002 || Socorro || LINEAR || — || align=right | 2.9 km || 
|-id=497 bgcolor=#fefefe
| 169497 ||  || — || February 10, 2002 || Socorro || LINEAR || — || align=right | 1.3 km || 
|-id=498 bgcolor=#fefefe
| 169498 ||  || — || February 10, 2002 || Socorro || LINEAR || MAS || align=right data-sort-value="0.97" | 970 m || 
|-id=499 bgcolor=#fefefe
| 169499 ||  || — || February 10, 2002 || Socorro || LINEAR || V || align=right | 1.1 km || 
|-id=500 bgcolor=#fefefe
| 169500 ||  || — || February 10, 2002 || Socorro || LINEAR || — || align=right | 1.2 km || 
|}

169501–169600 

|-bgcolor=#fefefe
| 169501 ||  || — || February 10, 2002 || Socorro || LINEAR || — || align=right | 1.3 km || 
|-id=502 bgcolor=#fefefe
| 169502 ||  || — || February 11, 2002 || Socorro || LINEAR || — || align=right | 1.2 km || 
|-id=503 bgcolor=#fefefe
| 169503 ||  || — || February 11, 2002 || Socorro || LINEAR || V || align=right | 1.1 km || 
|-id=504 bgcolor=#fefefe
| 169504 ||  || — || February 11, 2002 || Socorro || LINEAR || FLO || align=right | 1.5 km || 
|-id=505 bgcolor=#fefefe
| 169505 ||  || — || February 11, 2002 || Socorro || LINEAR || V || align=right | 1.3 km || 
|-id=506 bgcolor=#fefefe
| 169506 ||  || — || February 13, 2002 || Socorro || LINEAR || — || align=right | 1.5 km || 
|-id=507 bgcolor=#fefefe
| 169507 ||  || — || February 5, 2002 || Anderson Mesa || LONEOS || FLO || align=right | 1.00 km || 
|-id=508 bgcolor=#d6d6d6
| 169508 ||  || — || February 7, 2002 || Palomar || NEAT || 3:2 || align=right | 6.9 km || 
|-id=509 bgcolor=#d6d6d6
| 169509 ||  || — || February 7, 2002 || Kitt Peak || M. W. Buie || SHU3:2 || align=right | 10 km || 
|-id=510 bgcolor=#fefefe
| 169510 ||  || — || February 7, 2002 || Palomar || NEAT || NYS || align=right | 2.2 km || 
|-id=511 bgcolor=#fefefe
| 169511 ||  || — || February 11, 2002 || Socorro || LINEAR || — || align=right | 1.1 km || 
|-id=512 bgcolor=#fefefe
| 169512 ||  || — || February 12, 2002 || Socorro || LINEAR || — || align=right | 1.6 km || 
|-id=513 bgcolor=#fefefe
| 169513 ||  || — || February 16, 2002 || Palomar || NEAT || — || align=right | 1.3 km || 
|-id=514 bgcolor=#fefefe
| 169514 ||  || — || February 24, 2002 || Haleakala || NEAT || — || align=right | 1.9 km || 
|-id=515 bgcolor=#fefefe
| 169515 || 2002 EN || — || March 5, 2002 || Desert Eagle || W. K. Y. Yeung || — || align=right | 1.4 km || 
|-id=516 bgcolor=#FA8072
| 169516 || 2002 EQ || — || March 5, 2002 || Desert Eagle || W. K. Y. Yeung || — || align=right | 1.4 km || 
|-id=517 bgcolor=#fefefe
| 169517 ||  || — || March 10, 2002 || Fountain Hills || C. W. Juels, P. R. Holvorcem || — || align=right | 3.5 km || 
|-id=518 bgcolor=#fefefe
| 169518 ||  || — || March 14, 2002 || Desert Eagle || W. K. Y. Yeung || NYS || align=right | 1.1 km || 
|-id=519 bgcolor=#fefefe
| 169519 ||  || — || March 6, 2002 || Palomar || NEAT || — || align=right | 1.3 km || 
|-id=520 bgcolor=#fefefe
| 169520 ||  || — || March 10, 2002 || Haleakala || NEAT || — || align=right | 1.3 km || 
|-id=521 bgcolor=#fefefe
| 169521 ||  || — || March 11, 2002 || Palomar || NEAT || V || align=right | 2.4 km || 
|-id=522 bgcolor=#fefefe
| 169522 ||  || — || March 9, 2002 || Socorro || LINEAR || — || align=right | 1.4 km || 
|-id=523 bgcolor=#E9E9E9
| 169523 ||  || — || March 12, 2002 || Socorro || LINEAR || — || align=right | 1.6 km || 
|-id=524 bgcolor=#fefefe
| 169524 ||  || — || March 12, 2002 || Socorro || LINEAR || — || align=right | 1.7 km || 
|-id=525 bgcolor=#fefefe
| 169525 ||  || — || March 12, 2002 || Palomar || NEAT || NYS || align=right | 1.0 km || 
|-id=526 bgcolor=#fefefe
| 169526 ||  || — || March 12, 2002 || Palomar || NEAT || MAS || align=right | 1.1 km || 
|-id=527 bgcolor=#fefefe
| 169527 ||  || — || March 9, 2002 || Socorro || LINEAR || — || align=right | 1.2 km || 
|-id=528 bgcolor=#fefefe
| 169528 ||  || — || March 13, 2002 || Socorro || LINEAR || MAS || align=right | 1.2 km || 
|-id=529 bgcolor=#fefefe
| 169529 ||  || — || March 13, 2002 || Socorro || LINEAR || — || align=right | 1.4 km || 
|-id=530 bgcolor=#fefefe
| 169530 ||  || — || March 13, 2002 || Socorro || LINEAR || — || align=right | 1.0 km || 
|-id=531 bgcolor=#fefefe
| 169531 ||  || — || March 13, 2002 || Socorro || LINEAR || NYS || align=right data-sort-value="0.93" | 930 m || 
|-id=532 bgcolor=#fefefe
| 169532 ||  || — || March 13, 2002 || Socorro || LINEAR || NYS || align=right | 1.2 km || 
|-id=533 bgcolor=#fefefe
| 169533 ||  || — || March 13, 2002 || Socorro || LINEAR || NYS || align=right | 1.2 km || 
|-id=534 bgcolor=#fefefe
| 169534 ||  || — || March 13, 2002 || Socorro || LINEAR || — || align=right | 1.5 km || 
|-id=535 bgcolor=#fefefe
| 169535 ||  || — || March 13, 2002 || Socorro || LINEAR || NYS || align=right | 1.00 km || 
|-id=536 bgcolor=#fefefe
| 169536 ||  || — || March 13, 2002 || Socorro || LINEAR || FLO || align=right | 1.2 km || 
|-id=537 bgcolor=#fefefe
| 169537 ||  || — || March 13, 2002 || Socorro || LINEAR || — || align=right | 1.5 km || 
|-id=538 bgcolor=#fefefe
| 169538 ||  || — || March 13, 2002 || Socorro || LINEAR || NYS || align=right | 2.4 km || 
|-id=539 bgcolor=#fefefe
| 169539 ||  || — || March 13, 2002 || Palomar || NEAT || FLO || align=right data-sort-value="0.98" | 980 m || 
|-id=540 bgcolor=#fefefe
| 169540 ||  || — || March 13, 2002 || Palomar || NEAT || NYS || align=right | 1.3 km || 
|-id=541 bgcolor=#fefefe
| 169541 ||  || — || March 9, 2002 || Socorro || LINEAR || NYS || align=right | 1.0 km || 
|-id=542 bgcolor=#fefefe
| 169542 ||  || — || March 9, 2002 || Socorro || LINEAR || — || align=right | 1.4 km || 
|-id=543 bgcolor=#fefefe
| 169543 ||  || — || March 9, 2002 || Socorro || LINEAR || — || align=right | 1.0 km || 
|-id=544 bgcolor=#fefefe
| 169544 ||  || — || March 9, 2002 || Socorro || LINEAR || — || align=right | 1.5 km || 
|-id=545 bgcolor=#fefefe
| 169545 ||  || — || March 12, 2002 || Socorro || LINEAR || — || align=right | 1.5 km || 
|-id=546 bgcolor=#fefefe
| 169546 ||  || — || March 12, 2002 || Socorro || LINEAR || — || align=right | 1.4 km || 
|-id=547 bgcolor=#fefefe
| 169547 ||  || — || March 14, 2002 || Socorro || LINEAR || NYS || align=right | 1.0 km || 
|-id=548 bgcolor=#fefefe
| 169548 ||  || — || March 12, 2002 || Socorro || LINEAR || — || align=right | 1.5 km || 
|-id=549 bgcolor=#fefefe
| 169549 ||  || — || March 9, 2002 || Anderson Mesa || LONEOS || FLO || align=right | 1.1 km || 
|-id=550 bgcolor=#fefefe
| 169550 ||  || — || March 9, 2002 || Anderson Mesa || LONEOS || — || align=right | 1.5 km || 
|-id=551 bgcolor=#fefefe
| 169551 ||  || — || March 9, 2002 || Kitt Peak || Spacewatch || — || align=right | 1.0 km || 
|-id=552 bgcolor=#fefefe
| 169552 ||  || — || March 9, 2002 || Kitt Peak || Spacewatch || — || align=right | 1.4 km || 
|-id=553 bgcolor=#fefefe
| 169553 ||  || — || March 9, 2002 || Anderson Mesa || LONEOS || FLO || align=right data-sort-value="0.93" | 930 m || 
|-id=554 bgcolor=#fefefe
| 169554 ||  || — || March 10, 2002 || Anderson Mesa || LONEOS || — || align=right | 1.9 km || 
|-id=555 bgcolor=#fefefe
| 169555 ||  || — || March 10, 2002 || Haleakala || NEAT || V || align=right | 1.0 km || 
|-id=556 bgcolor=#fefefe
| 169556 ||  || — || March 9, 2002 || Kitt Peak || Spacewatch || NYS || align=right | 1.1 km || 
|-id=557 bgcolor=#fefefe
| 169557 ||  || — || March 13, 2002 || Palomar || NEAT || FLO || align=right data-sort-value="0.94" | 940 m || 
|-id=558 bgcolor=#fefefe
| 169558 ||  || — || March 12, 2002 || Palomar || NEAT || — || align=right | 1.0 km || 
|-id=559 bgcolor=#fefefe
| 169559 ||  || — || March 12, 2002 || Palomar || NEAT || NYS || align=right | 1.4 km || 
|-id=560 bgcolor=#fefefe
| 169560 ||  || — || March 12, 2002 || Kitt Peak || Spacewatch || — || align=right | 1.3 km || 
|-id=561 bgcolor=#fefefe
| 169561 ||  || — || March 12, 2002 || Palomar || NEAT || MAS || align=right | 1.1 km || 
|-id=562 bgcolor=#fefefe
| 169562 ||  || — || March 13, 2002 || Palomar || NEAT || — || align=right | 1.2 km || 
|-id=563 bgcolor=#fefefe
| 169563 ||  || — || March 5, 2002 || Anderson Mesa || LONEOS || FLO || align=right | 1.1 km || 
|-id=564 bgcolor=#fefefe
| 169564 ||  || — || March 5, 2002 || Anderson Mesa || LONEOS || NYS || align=right data-sort-value="0.88" | 880 m || 
|-id=565 bgcolor=#fefefe
| 169565 ||  || — || March 5, 2002 || Anderson Mesa || LONEOS || — || align=right | 1.4 km || 
|-id=566 bgcolor=#fefefe
| 169566 ||  || — || March 20, 2002 || Desert Eagle || W. K. Y. Yeung || FLO || align=right | 2.1 km || 
|-id=567 bgcolor=#fefefe
| 169567 ||  || — || March 20, 2002 || Desert Eagle || W. K. Y. Yeung || — || align=right | 1.6 km || 
|-id=568 bgcolor=#fefefe
| 169568 Baranauskas ||  ||  || March 16, 2002 || Moletai || K. Černis, J. Zdanavičius || NYS || align=right | 3.9 km || 
|-id=569 bgcolor=#fefefe
| 169569 ||  || — || March 16, 2002 || Socorro || LINEAR || FLO || align=right data-sort-value="0.90" | 900 m || 
|-id=570 bgcolor=#fefefe
| 169570 ||  || — || March 16, 2002 || Socorro || LINEAR || — || align=right | 1.4 km || 
|-id=571 bgcolor=#fefefe
| 169571 ||  || — || March 17, 2002 || Haleakala || NEAT || — || align=right | 1.4 km || 
|-id=572 bgcolor=#fefefe
| 169572 ||  || — || March 16, 2002 || Socorro || LINEAR || NYS || align=right | 1.2 km || 
|-id=573 bgcolor=#fefefe
| 169573 ||  || — || March 19, 2002 || Anderson Mesa || LONEOS || V || align=right data-sort-value="0.98" | 980 m || 
|-id=574 bgcolor=#fefefe
| 169574 ||  || — || March 19, 2002 || Anderson Mesa || LONEOS || — || align=right | 1.1 km || 
|-id=575 bgcolor=#fefefe
| 169575 ||  || — || April 14, 2002 || Desert Eagle || W. K. Y. Yeung || FLO || align=right | 1.1 km || 
|-id=576 bgcolor=#fefefe
| 169576 ||  || — || April 14, 2002 || Desert Eagle || W. K. Y. Yeung || — || align=right | 1.6 km || 
|-id=577 bgcolor=#fefefe
| 169577 ||  || — || April 15, 2002 || Socorro || LINEAR || — || align=right | 2.4 km || 
|-id=578 bgcolor=#fefefe
| 169578 ||  || — || April 15, 2002 || Socorro || LINEAR || — || align=right | 1.2 km || 
|-id=579 bgcolor=#fefefe
| 169579 ||  || — || April 14, 2002 || Socorro || LINEAR || NYS || align=right | 1.1 km || 
|-id=580 bgcolor=#fefefe
| 169580 ||  || — || April 14, 2002 || Socorro || LINEAR || NYS || align=right | 2.2 km || 
|-id=581 bgcolor=#fefefe
| 169581 ||  || — || April 14, 2002 || Socorro || LINEAR || V || align=right | 1.2 km || 
|-id=582 bgcolor=#fefefe
| 169582 ||  || — || April 14, 2002 || Haleakala || NEAT || — || align=right | 1.7 km || 
|-id=583 bgcolor=#fefefe
| 169583 ||  || — || April 15, 2002 || Kitt Peak || Spacewatch || — || align=right | 1.2 km || 
|-id=584 bgcolor=#fefefe
| 169584 ||  || — || April 1, 2002 || Palomar || NEAT || — || align=right | 1.3 km || 
|-id=585 bgcolor=#fefefe
| 169585 ||  || — || April 1, 2002 || Palomar || NEAT || V || align=right | 1.0 km || 
|-id=586 bgcolor=#fefefe
| 169586 ||  || — || April 4, 2002 || Palomar || NEAT || — || align=right | 1.2 km || 
|-id=587 bgcolor=#fefefe
| 169587 ||  || — || April 4, 2002 || Palomar || NEAT || — || align=right | 1.4 km || 
|-id=588 bgcolor=#fefefe
| 169588 ||  || — || April 5, 2002 || Palomar || NEAT || V || align=right | 1.5 km || 
|-id=589 bgcolor=#fefefe
| 169589 ||  || — || April 8, 2002 || Palomar || NEAT || NYS || align=right | 1.1 km || 
|-id=590 bgcolor=#E9E9E9
| 169590 ||  || — || April 8, 2002 || Socorro || LINEAR || MIT || align=right | 4.8 km || 
|-id=591 bgcolor=#E9E9E9
| 169591 ||  || — || April 8, 2002 || Socorro || LINEAR || — || align=right | 2.3 km || 
|-id=592 bgcolor=#fefefe
| 169592 ||  || — || April 8, 2002 || Palomar || NEAT || FLO || align=right | 2.6 km || 
|-id=593 bgcolor=#fefefe
| 169593 ||  || — || April 9, 2002 || Anderson Mesa || LONEOS || — || align=right | 1.2 km || 
|-id=594 bgcolor=#fefefe
| 169594 ||  || — || April 9, 2002 || Anderson Mesa || LONEOS || FLO || align=right data-sort-value="0.99" | 990 m || 
|-id=595 bgcolor=#fefefe
| 169595 ||  || — || April 9, 2002 || Anderson Mesa || LONEOS || V || align=right | 1.3 km || 
|-id=596 bgcolor=#fefefe
| 169596 ||  || — || April 9, 2002 || Kitt Peak || Spacewatch || EUT || align=right | 1.0 km || 
|-id=597 bgcolor=#fefefe
| 169597 ||  || — || April 9, 2002 || Socorro || LINEAR || NYS || align=right data-sort-value="0.96" | 960 m || 
|-id=598 bgcolor=#fefefe
| 169598 ||  || — || April 10, 2002 || Socorro || LINEAR || — || align=right | 1.1 km || 
|-id=599 bgcolor=#fefefe
| 169599 ||  || — || April 10, 2002 || Socorro || LINEAR || FLO || align=right | 1.7 km || 
|-id=600 bgcolor=#fefefe
| 169600 ||  || — || April 10, 2002 || Socorro || LINEAR || — || align=right | 3.0 km || 
|}

169601–169700 

|-bgcolor=#fefefe
| 169601 ||  || — || April 10, 2002 || Socorro || LINEAR || — || align=right | 1.4 km || 
|-id=602 bgcolor=#fefefe
| 169602 ||  || — || April 10, 2002 || Socorro || LINEAR || — || align=right | 1.8 km || 
|-id=603 bgcolor=#fefefe
| 169603 ||  || — || April 10, 2002 || Socorro || LINEAR || FLO || align=right | 1.3 km || 
|-id=604 bgcolor=#fefefe
| 169604 ||  || — || April 10, 2002 || Socorro || LINEAR || — || align=right | 1.3 km || 
|-id=605 bgcolor=#fefefe
| 169605 ||  || — || April 9, 2002 || Socorro || LINEAR || NYS || align=right | 2.2 km || 
|-id=606 bgcolor=#fefefe
| 169606 ||  || — || April 9, 2002 || Socorro || LINEAR || — || align=right | 1.4 km || 
|-id=607 bgcolor=#fefefe
| 169607 ||  || — || April 10, 2002 || Socorro || LINEAR || — || align=right | 2.8 km || 
|-id=608 bgcolor=#fefefe
| 169608 ||  || — || April 10, 2002 || Socorro || LINEAR || V || align=right | 1.1 km || 
|-id=609 bgcolor=#fefefe
| 169609 ||  || — || April 10, 2002 || Socorro || LINEAR || V || align=right | 1.0 km || 
|-id=610 bgcolor=#fefefe
| 169610 ||  || — || April 11, 2002 || Socorro || LINEAR || V || align=right | 1.2 km || 
|-id=611 bgcolor=#fefefe
| 169611 ||  || — || April 10, 2002 || Socorro || LINEAR || FLO || align=right | 1.2 km || 
|-id=612 bgcolor=#fefefe
| 169612 ||  || — || April 11, 2002 || Socorro || LINEAR || — || align=right | 1.6 km || 
|-id=613 bgcolor=#fefefe
| 169613 ||  || — || April 11, 2002 || Socorro || LINEAR || — || align=right | 1.5 km || 
|-id=614 bgcolor=#fefefe
| 169614 ||  || — || April 11, 2002 || Socorro || LINEAR || V || align=right | 1.1 km || 
|-id=615 bgcolor=#fefefe
| 169615 ||  || — || April 12, 2002 || Haleakala || NEAT || — || align=right | 3.3 km || 
|-id=616 bgcolor=#fefefe
| 169616 ||  || — || April 10, 2002 || Socorro || LINEAR || V || align=right data-sort-value="0.89" | 890 m || 
|-id=617 bgcolor=#fefefe
| 169617 ||  || — || April 12, 2002 || Socorro || LINEAR || V || align=right | 1.2 km || 
|-id=618 bgcolor=#fefefe
| 169618 ||  || — || April 12, 2002 || Socorro || LINEAR || — || align=right | 1.5 km || 
|-id=619 bgcolor=#E9E9E9
| 169619 ||  || — || April 12, 2002 || Socorro || LINEAR || — || align=right | 2.0 km || 
|-id=620 bgcolor=#fefefe
| 169620 ||  || — || April 11, 2002 || Socorro || LINEAR || — || align=right | 1.1 km || 
|-id=621 bgcolor=#fefefe
| 169621 ||  || — || April 13, 2002 || Palomar || NEAT || — || align=right | 2.8 km || 
|-id=622 bgcolor=#fefefe
| 169622 ||  || — || April 14, 2002 || Socorro || LINEAR || — || align=right | 1.6 km || 
|-id=623 bgcolor=#fefefe
| 169623 ||  || — || April 14, 2002 || Palomar || NEAT || — || align=right | 1.8 km || 
|-id=624 bgcolor=#fefefe
| 169624 ||  || — || April 14, 2002 || Palomar || NEAT || — || align=right | 1.2 km || 
|-id=625 bgcolor=#fefefe
| 169625 ||  || — || April 9, 2002 || Socorro || LINEAR || FLO || align=right data-sort-value="0.91" | 910 m || 
|-id=626 bgcolor=#fefefe
| 169626 ||  || — || April 9, 2002 || Socorro || LINEAR || FLO || align=right data-sort-value="0.95" | 950 m || 
|-id=627 bgcolor=#fefefe
| 169627 ||  || — || April 9, 2002 || Socorro || LINEAR || — || align=right | 1.3 km || 
|-id=628 bgcolor=#fefefe
| 169628 ||  || — || April 10, 2002 || Socorro || LINEAR || — || align=right | 3.1 km || 
|-id=629 bgcolor=#fefefe
| 169629 ||  || — || April 10, 2002 || Socorro || LINEAR || NYS || align=right | 1.9 km || 
|-id=630 bgcolor=#E9E9E9
| 169630 ||  || — || April 13, 2002 || Palomar || NEAT || — || align=right | 2.8 km || 
|-id=631 bgcolor=#fefefe
| 169631 ||  || — || April 16, 2002 || Socorro || LINEAR || — || align=right | 2.9 km || 
|-id=632 bgcolor=#E9E9E9
| 169632 ||  || — || April 19, 2002 || Reedy Creek || J. Broughton || — || align=right | 1.5 km || 
|-id=633 bgcolor=#fefefe
| 169633 ||  || — || April 21, 2002 || Palomar || NEAT || CIM || align=right | 3.1 km || 
|-id=634 bgcolor=#fefefe
| 169634 ||  || — || May 8, 2002 || Desert Eagle || W. K. Y. Yeung || — || align=right | 1.8 km || 
|-id=635 bgcolor=#fefefe
| 169635 ||  || — || May 8, 2002 || Socorro || LINEAR || PHO || align=right | 2.2 km || 
|-id=636 bgcolor=#fefefe
| 169636 ||  || — || May 8, 2002 || Socorro || LINEAR || — || align=right | 1.4 km || 
|-id=637 bgcolor=#fefefe
| 169637 ||  || — || May 8, 2002 || Haleakala || NEAT || NYS || align=right | 2.5 km || 
|-id=638 bgcolor=#fefefe
| 169638 ||  || — || May 8, 2002 || Haleakala || NEAT || — || align=right | 1.3 km || 
|-id=639 bgcolor=#fefefe
| 169639 ||  || — || May 8, 2002 || Socorro || LINEAR || NYS || align=right | 1.3 km || 
|-id=640 bgcolor=#fefefe
| 169640 ||  || — || May 8, 2002 || Socorro || LINEAR || NYS || align=right | 2.3 km || 
|-id=641 bgcolor=#fefefe
| 169641 ||  || — || May 8, 2002 || Socorro || LINEAR || V || align=right | 1.9 km || 
|-id=642 bgcolor=#fefefe
| 169642 ||  || — || May 8, 2002 || Socorro || LINEAR || — || align=right | 1.4 km || 
|-id=643 bgcolor=#fefefe
| 169643 ||  || — || May 8, 2002 || Socorro || LINEAR || — || align=right | 1.2 km || 
|-id=644 bgcolor=#fefefe
| 169644 ||  || — || May 9, 2002 || Socorro || LINEAR || FLO || align=right data-sort-value="0.86" | 860 m || 
|-id=645 bgcolor=#fefefe
| 169645 ||  || — || May 9, 2002 || Socorro || LINEAR || — || align=right | 1.3 km || 
|-id=646 bgcolor=#fefefe
| 169646 ||  || — || May 9, 2002 || Socorro || LINEAR || V || align=right | 1.3 km || 
|-id=647 bgcolor=#fefefe
| 169647 ||  || — || May 7, 2002 || Anderson Mesa || LONEOS || — || align=right | 1.8 km || 
|-id=648 bgcolor=#fefefe
| 169648 ||  || — || May 8, 2002 || Haleakala || NEAT || V || align=right | 1.2 km || 
|-id=649 bgcolor=#fefefe
| 169649 ||  || — || May 8, 2002 || Socorro || LINEAR || V || align=right | 1.3 km || 
|-id=650 bgcolor=#fefefe
| 169650 ||  || — || May 9, 2002 || Socorro || LINEAR || — || align=right | 1.5 km || 
|-id=651 bgcolor=#E9E9E9
| 169651 ||  || — || May 9, 2002 || Socorro || LINEAR || — || align=right | 2.5 km || 
|-id=652 bgcolor=#fefefe
| 169652 ||  || — || May 9, 2002 || Socorro || LINEAR || — || align=right | 1.6 km || 
|-id=653 bgcolor=#fefefe
| 169653 ||  || — || May 9, 2002 || Socorro || LINEAR || ERI || align=right | 2.9 km || 
|-id=654 bgcolor=#fefefe
| 169654 ||  || — || May 9, 2002 || Socorro || LINEAR || — || align=right | 1.4 km || 
|-id=655 bgcolor=#E9E9E9
| 169655 ||  || — || May 9, 2002 || Socorro || LINEAR || — || align=right | 1.4 km || 
|-id=656 bgcolor=#fefefe
| 169656 ||  || — || May 9, 2002 || Socorro || LINEAR || FLO || align=right | 1.2 km || 
|-id=657 bgcolor=#fefefe
| 169657 ||  || — || May 9, 2002 || Socorro || LINEAR || NYS || align=right | 1.3 km || 
|-id=658 bgcolor=#fefefe
| 169658 ||  || — || May 9, 2002 || Socorro || LINEAR || NYS || align=right | 1.1 km || 
|-id=659 bgcolor=#fefefe
| 169659 ||  || — || May 9, 2002 || Socorro || LINEAR || — || align=right | 1.6 km || 
|-id=660 bgcolor=#FA8072
| 169660 ||  || — || May 9, 2002 || Socorro || LINEAR || — || align=right | 1.4 km || 
|-id=661 bgcolor=#fefefe
| 169661 ||  || — || May 10, 2002 || Socorro || LINEAR || — || align=right | 1.5 km || 
|-id=662 bgcolor=#fefefe
| 169662 ||  || — || May 7, 2002 || Socorro || LINEAR || V || align=right | 1.3 km || 
|-id=663 bgcolor=#E9E9E9
| 169663 ||  || — || May 7, 2002 || Socorro || LINEAR || — || align=right | 3.7 km || 
|-id=664 bgcolor=#fefefe
| 169664 ||  || — || May 8, 2002 || Socorro || LINEAR || FLO || align=right data-sort-value="0.97" | 970 m || 
|-id=665 bgcolor=#fefefe
| 169665 ||  || — || May 9, 2002 || Socorro || LINEAR || — || align=right | 1.6 km || 
|-id=666 bgcolor=#fefefe
| 169666 ||  || — || May 11, 2002 || Socorro || LINEAR || — || align=right | 1.1 km || 
|-id=667 bgcolor=#fefefe
| 169667 ||  || — || May 11, 2002 || Socorro || LINEAR || — || align=right | 2.3 km || 
|-id=668 bgcolor=#fefefe
| 169668 ||  || — || May 11, 2002 || Socorro || LINEAR || — || align=right data-sort-value="0.93" | 930 m || 
|-id=669 bgcolor=#E9E9E9
| 169669 ||  || — || May 11, 2002 || Socorro || LINEAR || — || align=right | 2.8 km || 
|-id=670 bgcolor=#fefefe
| 169670 ||  || — || May 11, 2002 || Socorro || LINEAR || — || align=right | 1.8 km || 
|-id=671 bgcolor=#fefefe
| 169671 ||  || — || May 11, 2002 || Socorro || LINEAR || FLO || align=right data-sort-value="0.98" | 980 m || 
|-id=672 bgcolor=#fefefe
| 169672 ||  || — || May 11, 2002 || Socorro || LINEAR || — || align=right | 2.3 km || 
|-id=673 bgcolor=#fefefe
| 169673 ||  || — || May 11, 2002 || Socorro || LINEAR || — || align=right | 1.8 km || 
|-id=674 bgcolor=#fefefe
| 169674 ||  || — || May 11, 2002 || Socorro || LINEAR || — || align=right | 1.2 km || 
|-id=675 bgcolor=#FFC2E0
| 169675 ||  || — || May 9, 2002 || Socorro || LINEAR || AMO +1km || align=right | 1.7 km || 
|-id=676 bgcolor=#fefefe
| 169676 ||  || — || May 7, 2002 || Socorro || LINEAR || — || align=right | 1.7 km || 
|-id=677 bgcolor=#fefefe
| 169677 ||  || — || May 10, 2002 || Socorro || LINEAR || MAS || align=right | 1.3 km || 
|-id=678 bgcolor=#fefefe
| 169678 ||  || — || May 9, 2002 || Socorro || LINEAR || PHO || align=right | 3.3 km || 
|-id=679 bgcolor=#fefefe
| 169679 ||  || — || May 10, 2002 || Socorro || LINEAR || — || align=right | 2.3 km || 
|-id=680 bgcolor=#fefefe
| 169680 ||  || — || May 11, 2002 || Socorro || LINEAR || — || align=right | 1.0 km || 
|-id=681 bgcolor=#fefefe
| 169681 ||  || — || May 11, 2002 || Socorro || LINEAR || NYS || align=right data-sort-value="0.90" | 900 m || 
|-id=682 bgcolor=#fefefe
| 169682 ||  || — || May 15, 2002 || Palomar || NEAT || — || align=right | 1.1 km || 
|-id=683 bgcolor=#fefefe
| 169683 ||  || — || May 10, 2002 || Palomar || NEAT || V || align=right data-sort-value="0.98" | 980 m || 
|-id=684 bgcolor=#E9E9E9
| 169684 ||  || — || May 7, 2002 || Palomar || NEAT || — || align=right | 1.5 km || 
|-id=685 bgcolor=#fefefe
| 169685 ||  || — || May 7, 2002 || Palomar || NEAT || FLO || align=right | 1.2 km || 
|-id=686 bgcolor=#fefefe
| 169686 ||  || — || May 9, 2002 || Socorro || LINEAR || — || align=right | 1.6 km || 
|-id=687 bgcolor=#fefefe
| 169687 ||  || — || May 9, 2002 || Socorro || LINEAR || — || align=right | 2.5 km || 
|-id=688 bgcolor=#E9E9E9
| 169688 ||  || — || May 9, 2002 || Palomar || NEAT || — || align=right | 2.6 km || 
|-id=689 bgcolor=#fefefe
| 169689 ||  || — || May 10, 2002 || Palomar || NEAT || V || align=right | 1.2 km || 
|-id=690 bgcolor=#E9E9E9
| 169690 ||  || — || May 7, 2002 || Socorro || LINEAR || — || align=right | 2.1 km || 
|-id=691 bgcolor=#E9E9E9
| 169691 ||  || — || May 16, 2002 || Haleakala || NEAT || — || align=right | 1.9 km || 
|-id=692 bgcolor=#fefefe
| 169692 ||  || — || June 2, 2002 || Palomar || NEAT || — || align=right | 1.7 km || 
|-id=693 bgcolor=#E9E9E9
| 169693 ||  || — || June 5, 2002 || Socorro || LINEAR || — || align=right | 2.9 km || 
|-id=694 bgcolor=#E9E9E9
| 169694 ||  || — || June 4, 2002 || Palomar || NEAT || — || align=right | 2.2 km || 
|-id=695 bgcolor=#E9E9E9
| 169695 ||  || — || June 2, 2002 || Palomar || NEAT || — || align=right | 2.1 km || 
|-id=696 bgcolor=#E9E9E9
| 169696 ||  || — || June 5, 2002 || Socorro || LINEAR || — || align=right | 5.1 km || 
|-id=697 bgcolor=#E9E9E9
| 169697 ||  || — || June 5, 2002 || Socorro || LINEAR || — || align=right | 1.9 km || 
|-id=698 bgcolor=#fefefe
| 169698 ||  || — || June 6, 2002 || Socorro || LINEAR || NYS || align=right | 1.1 km || 
|-id=699 bgcolor=#E9E9E9
| 169699 ||  || — || June 6, 2002 || Socorro || LINEAR || — || align=right | 2.5 km || 
|-id=700 bgcolor=#E9E9E9
| 169700 ||  || — || June 8, 2002 || Socorro || LINEAR || JUN || align=right | 2.4 km || 
|}

169701–169800 

|-bgcolor=#fefefe
| 169701 ||  || — || June 9, 2002 || Socorro || LINEAR || — || align=right | 1.6 km || 
|-id=702 bgcolor=#E9E9E9
| 169702 ||  || — || June 9, 2002 || Socorro || LINEAR || — || align=right | 3.4 km || 
|-id=703 bgcolor=#E9E9E9
| 169703 ||  || — || June 8, 2002 || Socorro || LINEAR || — || align=right | 1.9 km || 
|-id=704 bgcolor=#E9E9E9
| 169704 ||  || — || June 9, 2002 || Socorro || LINEAR || — || align=right | 4.3 km || 
|-id=705 bgcolor=#E9E9E9
| 169705 ||  || — || June 9, 2002 || Socorro || LINEAR || — || align=right | 1.4 km || 
|-id=706 bgcolor=#E9E9E9
| 169706 ||  || — || June 6, 2002 || Socorro || LINEAR || — || align=right | 3.2 km || 
|-id=707 bgcolor=#fefefe
| 169707 ||  || — || June 10, 2002 || Socorro || LINEAR || — || align=right | 1.7 km || 
|-id=708 bgcolor=#E9E9E9
| 169708 ||  || — || June 10, 2002 || Socorro || LINEAR || — || align=right | 1.6 km || 
|-id=709 bgcolor=#E9E9E9
| 169709 ||  || — || June 10, 2002 || Socorro || LINEAR || — || align=right | 4.3 km || 
|-id=710 bgcolor=#E9E9E9
| 169710 ||  || — || June 10, 2002 || Socorro || LINEAR || — || align=right | 3.0 km || 
|-id=711 bgcolor=#E9E9E9
| 169711 ||  || — || June 5, 2002 || Palomar || NEAT || — || align=right | 1.2 km || 
|-id=712 bgcolor=#E9E9E9
| 169712 ||  || — || June 12, 2002 || Socorro || LINEAR || EUN || align=right | 2.0 km || 
|-id=713 bgcolor=#E9E9E9
| 169713 ||  || — || June 7, 2002 || Kitt Peak || Spacewatch || MAR || align=right | 2.0 km || 
|-id=714 bgcolor=#fefefe
| 169714 ||  || — || June 9, 2002 || Socorro || LINEAR || V || align=right | 1.3 km || 
|-id=715 bgcolor=#E9E9E9
| 169715 ||  || — || June 9, 2002 || Haleakala || NEAT || — || align=right | 2.6 km || 
|-id=716 bgcolor=#fefefe
| 169716 ||  || — || June 5, 2002 || Palomar || NEAT || NYS || align=right | 1.2 km || 
|-id=717 bgcolor=#E9E9E9
| 169717 || 2002 MF || — || June 17, 2002 || Kitt Peak || Spacewatch || EUN || align=right | 2.0 km || 
|-id=718 bgcolor=#E9E9E9
| 169718 || 2002 MJ || — || June 17, 2002 || Campo Imperatore || CINEOS || MAR || align=right | 2.1 km || 
|-id=719 bgcolor=#fefefe
| 169719 ||  || — || June 16, 2002 || Palomar || NEAT || V || align=right | 1.2 km || 
|-id=720 bgcolor=#E9E9E9
| 169720 ||  || — || July 1, 2002 || Palomar || NEAT || — || align=right | 2.0 km || 
|-id=721 bgcolor=#E9E9E9
| 169721 ||  || — || July 4, 2002 || Palomar || NEAT || — || align=right | 3.3 km || 
|-id=722 bgcolor=#E9E9E9
| 169722 ||  || — || July 4, 2002 || Palomar || NEAT || — || align=right | 2.1 km || 
|-id=723 bgcolor=#E9E9E9
| 169723 ||  || — || July 5, 2002 || Socorro || LINEAR || — || align=right | 2.5 km || 
|-id=724 bgcolor=#E9E9E9
| 169724 ||  || — || July 12, 2002 || Palomar || NEAT || — || align=right | 2.0 km || 
|-id=725 bgcolor=#E9E9E9
| 169725 ||  || — || July 13, 2002 || Haleakala || NEAT || — || align=right | 3.0 km || 
|-id=726 bgcolor=#E9E9E9
| 169726 ||  || — || July 13, 2002 || Socorro || LINEAR || — || align=right | 2.3 km || 
|-id=727 bgcolor=#E9E9E9
| 169727 ||  || — || July 9, 2002 || Socorro || LINEAR || RAF || align=right | 1.6 km || 
|-id=728 bgcolor=#E9E9E9
| 169728 ||  || — || July 9, 2002 || Socorro || LINEAR || — || align=right | 1.4 km || 
|-id=729 bgcolor=#E9E9E9
| 169729 ||  || — || July 9, 2002 || Socorro || LINEAR || — || align=right | 3.0 km || 
|-id=730 bgcolor=#E9E9E9
| 169730 ||  || — || July 11, 2002 || Bergisch Gladbach || W. Bickel || NEM || align=right | 3.8 km || 
|-id=731 bgcolor=#E9E9E9
| 169731 ||  || — || July 14, 2002 || Socorro || LINEAR || — || align=right | 3.9 km || 
|-id=732 bgcolor=#E9E9E9
| 169732 ||  || — || July 14, 2002 || Socorro || LINEAR || — || align=right | 2.1 km || 
|-id=733 bgcolor=#E9E9E9
| 169733 ||  || — || July 14, 2002 || Palomar || NEAT || — || align=right | 1.8 km || 
|-id=734 bgcolor=#E9E9E9
| 169734 ||  || — || July 3, 2002 || Palomar || NEAT || WIT || align=right | 1.7 km || 
|-id=735 bgcolor=#E9E9E9
| 169735 ||  || — || July 10, 2002 || Palomar || NEAT || — || align=right | 3.6 km || 
|-id=736 bgcolor=#E9E9E9
| 169736 ||  || — || July 14, 2002 || Palomar || NEAT || — || align=right | 1.4 km || 
|-id=737 bgcolor=#E9E9E9
| 169737 ||  || — || July 17, 2002 || Socorro || LINEAR || — || align=right | 1.9 km || 
|-id=738 bgcolor=#E9E9E9
| 169738 ||  || — || July 17, 2002 || Socorro || LINEAR || — || align=right | 6.3 km || 
|-id=739 bgcolor=#E9E9E9
| 169739 ||  || — || July 17, 2002 || Socorro || LINEAR || ADE || align=right | 4.7 km || 
|-id=740 bgcolor=#E9E9E9
| 169740 ||  || — || July 16, 2002 || Bergisch Gladbach || W. Bickel || HNS || align=right | 2.1 km || 
|-id=741 bgcolor=#E9E9E9
| 169741 ||  || — || July 20, 2002 || Palomar || NEAT || DOR || align=right | 4.1 km || 
|-id=742 bgcolor=#E9E9E9
| 169742 ||  || — || July 18, 2002 || Socorro || LINEAR || MAR || align=right | 1.7 km || 
|-id=743 bgcolor=#E9E9E9
| 169743 ||  || — || July 18, 2002 || Socorro || LINEAR || ADE || align=right | 4.2 km || 
|-id=744 bgcolor=#E9E9E9
| 169744 ||  || — || July 18, 2002 || Socorro || LINEAR || RAF || align=right | 1.9 km || 
|-id=745 bgcolor=#E9E9E9
| 169745 ||  || — || July 18, 2002 || Socorro || LINEAR || — || align=right | 3.8 km || 
|-id=746 bgcolor=#E9E9E9
| 169746 ||  || — || July 21, 2002 || Palomar || NEAT || — || align=right | 3.4 km || 
|-id=747 bgcolor=#d6d6d6
| 169747 ||  || — || July 23, 2002 || Palomar || S. F. Hönig || CHA || align=right | 3.3 km || 
|-id=748 bgcolor=#E9E9E9
| 169748 ||  || — || July 30, 2002 || Haleakala || A. Lowe || — || align=right | 1.3 km || 
|-id=749 bgcolor=#E9E9E9
| 169749 ||  || — || August 3, 2002 || Palomar || NEAT || — || align=right | 1.9 km || 
|-id=750 bgcolor=#E9E9E9
| 169750 ||  || — || August 4, 2002 || Palomar || NEAT || — || align=right | 3.1 km || 
|-id=751 bgcolor=#E9E9E9
| 169751 ||  || — || August 4, 2002 || Palomar || NEAT || — || align=right | 3.9 km || 
|-id=752 bgcolor=#E9E9E9
| 169752 ||  || — || August 6, 2002 || Palomar || NEAT || — || align=right | 1.2 km || 
|-id=753 bgcolor=#E9E9E9
| 169753 ||  || — || August 6, 2002 || Palomar || NEAT || — || align=right | 3.4 km || 
|-id=754 bgcolor=#E9E9E9
| 169754 ||  || — || August 6, 2002 || Palomar || NEAT || — || align=right | 2.2 km || 
|-id=755 bgcolor=#E9E9E9
| 169755 ||  || — || August 6, 2002 || Palomar || NEAT || — || align=right | 1.5 km || 
|-id=756 bgcolor=#E9E9E9
| 169756 ||  || — || August 6, 2002 || Palomar || NEAT || — || align=right | 3.4 km || 
|-id=757 bgcolor=#E9E9E9
| 169757 ||  || — || August 6, 2002 || Palomar || NEAT || — || align=right | 1.5 km || 
|-id=758 bgcolor=#E9E9E9
| 169758 ||  || — || August 7, 2002 || Reedy Creek || J. Broughton || GEF || align=right | 2.1 km || 
|-id=759 bgcolor=#E9E9E9
| 169759 ||  || — || August 6, 2002 || Palomar || NEAT || — || align=right | 2.3 km || 
|-id=760 bgcolor=#E9E9E9
| 169760 ||  || — || August 4, 2002 || Socorro || LINEAR || — || align=right | 4.9 km || 
|-id=761 bgcolor=#E9E9E9
| 169761 ||  || — || August 10, 2002 || Socorro || LINEAR || GEF || align=right | 2.6 km || 
|-id=762 bgcolor=#E9E9E9
| 169762 ||  || — || August 10, 2002 || Socorro || LINEAR || RAF || align=right | 1.8 km || 
|-id=763 bgcolor=#E9E9E9
| 169763 ||  || — || August 8, 2002 || Palomar || NEAT || — || align=right | 2.4 km || 
|-id=764 bgcolor=#E9E9E9
| 169764 ||  || — || August 9, 2002 || Socorro || LINEAR || — || align=right | 3.3 km || 
|-id=765 bgcolor=#E9E9E9
| 169765 ||  || — || August 10, 2002 || Socorro || LINEAR || — || align=right | 4.3 km || 
|-id=766 bgcolor=#E9E9E9
| 169766 ||  || — || August 12, 2002 || Socorro || LINEAR || ADE || align=right | 2.8 km || 
|-id=767 bgcolor=#E9E9E9
| 169767 ||  || — || August 12, 2002 || Socorro || LINEAR || — || align=right | 4.0 km || 
|-id=768 bgcolor=#E9E9E9
| 169768 ||  || — || August 11, 2002 || Haleakala || NEAT || — || align=right | 3.8 km || 
|-id=769 bgcolor=#E9E9E9
| 169769 ||  || — || August 13, 2002 || Socorro || LINEAR || — || align=right | 1.7 km || 
|-id=770 bgcolor=#E9E9E9
| 169770 ||  || — || August 11, 2002 || Socorro || LINEAR || — || align=right | 3.3 km || 
|-id=771 bgcolor=#E9E9E9
| 169771 ||  || — || August 11, 2002 || Socorro || LINEAR || — || align=right | 3.6 km || 
|-id=772 bgcolor=#E9E9E9
| 169772 ||  || — || August 11, 2002 || Socorro || LINEAR || — || align=right | 3.2 km || 
|-id=773 bgcolor=#E9E9E9
| 169773 ||  || — || August 11, 2002 || Socorro || LINEAR || — || align=right | 3.5 km || 
|-id=774 bgcolor=#E9E9E9
| 169774 ||  || — || August 12, 2002 || Socorro || LINEAR || GAL || align=right | 6.9 km || 
|-id=775 bgcolor=#E9E9E9
| 169775 ||  || — || August 14, 2002 || Socorro || LINEAR || MAR || align=right | 2.0 km || 
|-id=776 bgcolor=#E9E9E9
| 169776 ||  || — || August 12, 2002 || Socorro || LINEAR || — || align=right | 3.5 km || 
|-id=777 bgcolor=#E9E9E9
| 169777 ||  || — || August 12, 2002 || Socorro || LINEAR || — || align=right | 3.4 km || 
|-id=778 bgcolor=#E9E9E9
| 169778 ||  || — || August 12, 2002 || Socorro || LINEAR || — || align=right | 2.5 km || 
|-id=779 bgcolor=#E9E9E9
| 169779 ||  || — || August 12, 2002 || Socorro || LINEAR || — || align=right | 3.2 km || 
|-id=780 bgcolor=#E9E9E9
| 169780 ||  || — || August 14, 2002 || Anderson Mesa || LONEOS || — || align=right | 4.2 km || 
|-id=781 bgcolor=#E9E9E9
| 169781 ||  || — || August 13, 2002 || Anderson Mesa || LONEOS || — || align=right | 4.8 km || 
|-id=782 bgcolor=#E9E9E9
| 169782 ||  || — || August 13, 2002 || Anderson Mesa || LONEOS || — || align=right | 3.5 km || 
|-id=783 bgcolor=#fefefe
| 169783 ||  || — || August 14, 2002 || Socorro || LINEAR || — || align=right | 1.5 km || 
|-id=784 bgcolor=#E9E9E9
| 169784 ||  || — || August 14, 2002 || Socorro || LINEAR || — || align=right | 3.0 km || 
|-id=785 bgcolor=#E9E9E9
| 169785 ||  || — || August 14, 2002 || Socorro || LINEAR || — || align=right | 2.9 km || 
|-id=786 bgcolor=#E9E9E9
| 169786 ||  || — || August 15, 2002 || Palomar || NEAT || — || align=right | 1.6 km || 
|-id=787 bgcolor=#E9E9E9
| 169787 ||  || — || August 15, 2002 || Anderson Mesa || LONEOS || — || align=right | 3.9 km || 
|-id=788 bgcolor=#E9E9E9
| 169788 ||  || — || August 13, 2002 || Socorro || LINEAR || INO || align=right | 2.3 km || 
|-id=789 bgcolor=#E9E9E9
| 169789 ||  || — || August 8, 2002 || Palomar || S. F. Hönig || — || align=right | 1.2 km || 
|-id=790 bgcolor=#E9E9E9
| 169790 ||  || — || August 8, 2002 || Palomar || S. F. Hönig || — || align=right | 2.3 km || 
|-id=791 bgcolor=#E9E9E9
| 169791 ||  || — || August 8, 2002 || Palomar || S. F. Hönig || — || align=right | 2.5 km || 
|-id=792 bgcolor=#E9E9E9
| 169792 ||  || — || August 8, 2002 || Palomar || S. F. Hönig || — || align=right | 2.2 km || 
|-id=793 bgcolor=#E9E9E9
| 169793 ||  || — || August 8, 2002 || Palomar || S. F. Hönig || — || align=right | 1.4 km || 
|-id=794 bgcolor=#E9E9E9
| 169794 ||  || — || August 7, 2002 || Palomar || NEAT || — || align=right | 1.6 km || 
|-id=795 bgcolor=#E9E9E9
| 169795 ||  || — || August 11, 2002 || Haleakala || NEAT || — || align=right | 3.7 km || 
|-id=796 bgcolor=#E9E9E9
| 169796 ||  || — || August 8, 2002 || Palomar || NEAT || — || align=right | 2.5 km || 
|-id=797 bgcolor=#E9E9E9
| 169797 ||  || — || August 15, 2002 || Palomar || NEAT || — || align=right | 1.1 km || 
|-id=798 bgcolor=#E9E9E9
| 169798 ||  || — || August 15, 2002 || Palomar || NEAT || — || align=right | 2.5 km || 
|-id=799 bgcolor=#E9E9E9
| 169799 || 2002 QO || — || August 16, 2002 || Socorro || LINEAR || DOR || align=right | 5.7 km || 
|-id=800 bgcolor=#E9E9E9
| 169800 ||  || — || August 16, 2002 || Haleakala || NEAT || AGN || align=right | 1.8 km || 
|}

169801–169900 

|-bgcolor=#E9E9E9
| 169801 ||  || — || August 19, 2002 || Kvistaberg || UDAS || — || align=right | 3.0 km || 
|-id=802 bgcolor=#E9E9E9
| 169802 ||  || — || August 16, 2002 || Palomar || NEAT || — || align=right | 3.9 km || 
|-id=803 bgcolor=#E9E9E9
| 169803 ||  || — || August 26, 2002 || Palomar || NEAT || — || align=right | 2.0 km || 
|-id=804 bgcolor=#E9E9E9
| 169804 ||  || — || August 26, 2002 || Palomar || NEAT || HOF || align=right | 3.6 km || 
|-id=805 bgcolor=#E9E9E9
| 169805 ||  || — || August 26, 2002 || Palomar || NEAT || — || align=right | 3.6 km || 
|-id=806 bgcolor=#E9E9E9
| 169806 ||  || — || August 26, 2002 || Palomar || NEAT || AGN || align=right | 2.0 km || 
|-id=807 bgcolor=#E9E9E9
| 169807 ||  || — || August 26, 2002 || Palomar || NEAT || NEM || align=right | 3.7 km || 
|-id=808 bgcolor=#E9E9E9
| 169808 ||  || — || August 26, 2002 || Palomar || NEAT || — || align=right | 1.5 km || 
|-id=809 bgcolor=#E9E9E9
| 169809 ||  || — || August 28, 2002 || Palomar || NEAT || HEN || align=right | 2.0 km || 
|-id=810 bgcolor=#E9E9E9
| 169810 ||  || — || August 29, 2002 || Palomar || NEAT || — || align=right | 1.8 km || 
|-id=811 bgcolor=#E9E9E9
| 169811 ||  || — || August 29, 2002 || Palomar || NEAT || — || align=right | 3.7 km || 
|-id=812 bgcolor=#E9E9E9
| 169812 ||  || — || August 29, 2002 || Palomar || NEAT || HNS || align=right | 2.0 km || 
|-id=813 bgcolor=#E9E9E9
| 169813 ||  || — || August 29, 2002 || Palomar || NEAT || — || align=right | 2.7 km || 
|-id=814 bgcolor=#E9E9E9
| 169814 ||  || — || August 29, 2002 || Palomar || NEAT || MRX || align=right | 2.0 km || 
|-id=815 bgcolor=#E9E9E9
| 169815 ||  || — || August 28, 2002 || Palomar || R. Matson || — || align=right | 4.5 km || 
|-id=816 bgcolor=#E9E9E9
| 169816 ||  || — || August 29, 2002 || Palomar || S. F. Hönig || — || align=right | 2.9 km || 
|-id=817 bgcolor=#E9E9E9
| 169817 ||  || — || August 29, 2002 || Palomar || S. F. Hönig || — || align=right | 2.0 km || 
|-id=818 bgcolor=#E9E9E9
| 169818 ||  || — || August 29, 2002 || Palomar || S. F. Hönig || GEF || align=right | 2.1 km || 
|-id=819 bgcolor=#E9E9E9
| 169819 ||  || — || August 29, 2002 || Palomar || S. F. Hönig || — || align=right | 3.8 km || 
|-id=820 bgcolor=#E9E9E9
| 169820 ||  || — || August 17, 2002 || Palomar || A. Lowe || — || align=right | 2.9 km || 
|-id=821 bgcolor=#E9E9E9
| 169821 ||  || — || August 29, 2002 || Palomar || S. F. Hönig || — || align=right | 3.1 km || 
|-id=822 bgcolor=#E9E9E9
| 169822 ||  || — || August 26, 2002 || Palomar || NEAT || PAD || align=right | 2.9 km || 
|-id=823 bgcolor=#E9E9E9
| 169823 ||  || — || August 17, 2002 || Palomar || NEAT || — || align=right | 1.1 km || 
|-id=824 bgcolor=#E9E9E9
| 169824 ||  || — || August 27, 2002 || Palomar || NEAT || PAD || align=right | 3.9 km || 
|-id=825 bgcolor=#E9E9E9
| 169825 ||  || — || August 18, 2002 || Palomar || NEAT || — || align=right | 2.5 km || 
|-id=826 bgcolor=#d6d6d6
| 169826 ||  || — || August 27, 2002 || Palomar || NEAT || — || align=right | 3.4 km || 
|-id=827 bgcolor=#E9E9E9
| 169827 ||  || — || August 28, 2002 || Palomar || NEAT || EUN || align=right | 2.0 km || 
|-id=828 bgcolor=#E9E9E9
| 169828 ||  || — || August 19, 2002 || Palomar || NEAT || — || align=right | 1.4 km || 
|-id=829 bgcolor=#E9E9E9
| 169829 ||  || — || August 17, 2002 || Palomar || NEAT || — || align=right | 2.9 km || 
|-id=830 bgcolor=#d6d6d6
| 169830 ||  || — || August 17, 2002 || Palomar || NEAT || EOS || align=right | 2.7 km || 
|-id=831 bgcolor=#E9E9E9
| 169831 ||  || — || August 26, 2002 || Palomar || NEAT || — || align=right | 2.6 km || 
|-id=832 bgcolor=#E9E9E9
| 169832 ||  || — || August 27, 2002 || Palomar || NEAT || — || align=right | 2.1 km || 
|-id=833 bgcolor=#E9E9E9
| 169833 ||  || — || August 19, 2002 || Palomar || NEAT || — || align=right | 5.0 km || 
|-id=834 bgcolor=#E9E9E9
| 169834 Hujie ||  ||  || August 28, 2002 || Palomar || NEAT || — || align=right | 2.2 km || 
|-id=835 bgcolor=#E9E9E9
| 169835 ||  || — || August 18, 2002 || Palomar || NEAT || — || align=right | 2.8 km || 
|-id=836 bgcolor=#E9E9E9
| 169836 ||  || — || August 19, 2002 || Palomar || NEAT || MRX || align=right | 1.6 km || 
|-id=837 bgcolor=#E9E9E9
| 169837 ||  || — || August 17, 2002 || Palomar || NEAT || — || align=right | 3.8 km || 
|-id=838 bgcolor=#E9E9E9
| 169838 ||  || — || August 17, 2002 || Palomar || NEAT || HEN || align=right | 1.1 km || 
|-id=839 bgcolor=#E9E9E9
| 169839 ||  || — || August 16, 2002 || Palomar || NEAT || HNA || align=right | 2.8 km || 
|-id=840 bgcolor=#E9E9E9
| 169840 ||  || — || September 3, 2002 || Palomar || NEAT || EUN || align=right | 2.6 km || 
|-id=841 bgcolor=#E9E9E9
| 169841 ||  || — || September 2, 2002 || Palomar || NEAT || — || align=right | 2.4 km || 
|-id=842 bgcolor=#E9E9E9
| 169842 ||  || — || September 2, 2002 || Haleakala || NEAT || — || align=right | 2.3 km || 
|-id=843 bgcolor=#E9E9E9
| 169843 ||  || — || September 4, 2002 || Campo Imperatore || CINEOS || — || align=right | 4.3 km || 
|-id=844 bgcolor=#E9E9E9
| 169844 ||  || — || September 4, 2002 || Palomar || NEAT || — || align=right | 2.6 km || 
|-id=845 bgcolor=#E9E9E9
| 169845 ||  || — || September 4, 2002 || Palomar || NEAT || — || align=right | 5.3 km || 
|-id=846 bgcolor=#E9E9E9
| 169846 ||  || — || September 4, 2002 || Anderson Mesa || LONEOS || HOF || align=right | 4.1 km || 
|-id=847 bgcolor=#E9E9E9
| 169847 ||  || — || September 4, 2002 || Anderson Mesa || LONEOS || DOR || align=right | 3.0 km || 
|-id=848 bgcolor=#d6d6d6
| 169848 ||  || — || September 4, 2002 || Anderson Mesa || LONEOS || KOR || align=right | 2.6 km || 
|-id=849 bgcolor=#d6d6d6
| 169849 ||  || — || September 4, 2002 || Anderson Mesa || LONEOS || KOR || align=right | 2.2 km || 
|-id=850 bgcolor=#d6d6d6
| 169850 ||  || — || September 4, 2002 || Anderson Mesa || LONEOS || — || align=right | 6.1 km || 
|-id=851 bgcolor=#E9E9E9
| 169851 ||  || — || September 4, 2002 || Anderson Mesa || LONEOS || — || align=right | 3.1 km || 
|-id=852 bgcolor=#E9E9E9
| 169852 ||  || — || September 5, 2002 || Anderson Mesa || LONEOS || ADE || align=right | 4.8 km || 
|-id=853 bgcolor=#E9E9E9
| 169853 ||  || — || September 5, 2002 || Anderson Mesa || LONEOS || DOR || align=right | 3.0 km || 
|-id=854 bgcolor=#E9E9E9
| 169854 ||  || — || September 5, 2002 || Socorro || LINEAR || HNA || align=right | 4.5 km || 
|-id=855 bgcolor=#d6d6d6
| 169855 ||  || — || September 5, 2002 || Socorro || LINEAR || slow || align=right | 4.6 km || 
|-id=856 bgcolor=#E9E9E9
| 169856 ||  || — || September 5, 2002 || Socorro || LINEAR || WIT || align=right | 1.8 km || 
|-id=857 bgcolor=#E9E9E9
| 169857 ||  || — || September 5, 2002 || Socorro || LINEAR || — || align=right | 1.6 km || 
|-id=858 bgcolor=#E9E9E9
| 169858 ||  || — || September 5, 2002 || Anderson Mesa || LONEOS || PAD || align=right | 3.8 km || 
|-id=859 bgcolor=#E9E9E9
| 169859 ||  || — || September 5, 2002 || Socorro || LINEAR || — || align=right | 1.6 km || 
|-id=860 bgcolor=#E9E9E9
| 169860 ||  || — || September 5, 2002 || Anderson Mesa || LONEOS || — || align=right | 4.1 km || 
|-id=861 bgcolor=#d6d6d6
| 169861 ||  || — || September 5, 2002 || Anderson Mesa || LONEOS || — || align=right | 3.4 km || 
|-id=862 bgcolor=#E9E9E9
| 169862 ||  || — || September 5, 2002 || Socorro || LINEAR || GEF || align=right | 2.4 km || 
|-id=863 bgcolor=#d6d6d6
| 169863 ||  || — || September 5, 2002 || Socorro || LINEAR || — || align=right | 7.3 km || 
|-id=864 bgcolor=#E9E9E9
| 169864 ||  || — || September 5, 2002 || Socorro || LINEAR || — || align=right | 3.1 km || 
|-id=865 bgcolor=#E9E9E9
| 169865 ||  || — || September 5, 2002 || Socorro || LINEAR || HNA || align=right | 4.2 km || 
|-id=866 bgcolor=#E9E9E9
| 169866 ||  || — || September 5, 2002 || Socorro || LINEAR || PAD || align=right | 3.6 km || 
|-id=867 bgcolor=#E9E9E9
| 169867 ||  || — || September 5, 2002 || Socorro || LINEAR || AGN || align=right | 1.8 km || 
|-id=868 bgcolor=#E9E9E9
| 169868 ||  || — || September 5, 2002 || Anderson Mesa || LONEOS || — || align=right | 4.0 km || 
|-id=869 bgcolor=#E9E9E9
| 169869 ||  || — || September 5, 2002 || Socorro || LINEAR || — || align=right | 5.2 km || 
|-id=870 bgcolor=#E9E9E9
| 169870 ||  || — || September 5, 2002 || Socorro || LINEAR || MRX || align=right | 2.2 km || 
|-id=871 bgcolor=#E9E9E9
| 169871 ||  || — || September 5, 2002 || Socorro || LINEAR || — || align=right | 4.6 km || 
|-id=872 bgcolor=#E9E9E9
| 169872 ||  || — || September 5, 2002 || Socorro || LINEAR || GEF || align=right | 2.2 km || 
|-id=873 bgcolor=#E9E9E9
| 169873 ||  || — || September 5, 2002 || Socorro || LINEAR || INO || align=right | 2.2 km || 
|-id=874 bgcolor=#E9E9E9
| 169874 ||  || — || September 7, 2002 || Socorro || LINEAR || — || align=right | 4.7 km || 
|-id=875 bgcolor=#E9E9E9
| 169875 ||  || — || September 7, 2002 || Pla D'Arguines || R. Ferrando || NEM || align=right | 4.4 km || 
|-id=876 bgcolor=#E9E9E9
| 169876 ||  || — || September 3, 2002 || Campo Imperatore || CINEOS || HNS || align=right | 1.7 km || 
|-id=877 bgcolor=#E9E9E9
| 169877 ||  || — || September 10, 2002 || Haleakala || NEAT || — || align=right | 7.6 km || 
|-id=878 bgcolor=#d6d6d6
| 169878 ||  || — || September 11, 2002 || Palomar || NEAT || — || align=right | 3.2 km || 
|-id=879 bgcolor=#E9E9E9
| 169879 ||  || — || September 10, 2002 || Palomar || NEAT || — || align=right | 5.2 km || 
|-id=880 bgcolor=#d6d6d6
| 169880 ||  || — || September 11, 2002 || Palomar || NEAT || — || align=right | 3.5 km || 
|-id=881 bgcolor=#E9E9E9
| 169881 ||  || — || September 11, 2002 || Palomar || NEAT || — || align=right | 2.9 km || 
|-id=882 bgcolor=#d6d6d6
| 169882 ||  || — || September 11, 2002 || Palomar || NEAT || — || align=right | 4.2 km || 
|-id=883 bgcolor=#E9E9E9
| 169883 ||  || — || September 12, 2002 || Palomar || NEAT || — || align=right | 2.6 km || 
|-id=884 bgcolor=#E9E9E9
| 169884 ||  || — || September 12, 2002 || Palomar || NEAT || GEF || align=right | 2.1 km || 
|-id=885 bgcolor=#E9E9E9
| 169885 ||  || — || September 12, 2002 || Palomar || NEAT || — || align=right | 3.9 km || 
|-id=886 bgcolor=#E9E9E9
| 169886 ||  || — || September 11, 2002 || Palomar || NEAT || DOR || align=right | 3.6 km || 
|-id=887 bgcolor=#d6d6d6
| 169887 ||  || — || September 13, 2002 || Palomar || NEAT || KOR || align=right | 1.7 km || 
|-id=888 bgcolor=#E9E9E9
| 169888 ||  || — || September 13, 2002 || Socorro || LINEAR || HNA || align=right | 4.4 km || 
|-id=889 bgcolor=#E9E9E9
| 169889 ||  || — || September 13, 2002 || Palomar || NEAT || HNA || align=right | 4.0 km || 
|-id=890 bgcolor=#E9E9E9
| 169890 ||  || — || September 13, 2002 || Anderson Mesa || LONEOS || — || align=right | 2.4 km || 
|-id=891 bgcolor=#d6d6d6
| 169891 ||  || — || September 13, 2002 || Palomar || NEAT || — || align=right | 5.3 km || 
|-id=892 bgcolor=#E9E9E9
| 169892 ||  || — || September 13, 2002 || Socorro || LINEAR || — || align=right | 2.7 km || 
|-id=893 bgcolor=#E9E9E9
| 169893 ||  || — || September 13, 2002 || Palomar || NEAT || — || align=right | 2.1 km || 
|-id=894 bgcolor=#d6d6d6
| 169894 ||  || — || September 13, 2002 || Palomar || NEAT || EOS || align=right | 3.4 km || 
|-id=895 bgcolor=#E9E9E9
| 169895 ||  || — || September 13, 2002 || Palomar || NEAT || WIT || align=right | 1.9 km || 
|-id=896 bgcolor=#E9E9E9
| 169896 ||  || — || September 11, 2002 || Palomar || NEAT || — || align=right | 3.6 km || 
|-id=897 bgcolor=#E9E9E9
| 169897 ||  || — || September 12, 2002 || Palomar || NEAT || — || align=right | 3.7 km || 
|-id=898 bgcolor=#E9E9E9
| 169898 ||  || — || September 14, 2002 || Palomar || NEAT || — || align=right | 3.6 km || 
|-id=899 bgcolor=#E9E9E9
| 169899 ||  || — || September 14, 2002 || Palomar || NEAT || — || align=right | 2.6 km || 
|-id=900 bgcolor=#E9E9E9
| 169900 ||  || — || September 14, 2002 || Palomar || NEAT || WIT || align=right | 1.8 km || 
|}

169901–170000 

|-bgcolor=#E9E9E9
| 169901 ||  || — || September 14, 2002 || Palomar || NEAT || — || align=right | 2.5 km || 
|-id=902 bgcolor=#E9E9E9
| 169902 ||  || — || September 14, 2002 || Palomar || NEAT || AGN || align=right | 2.2 km || 
|-id=903 bgcolor=#E9E9E9
| 169903 ||  || — || September 14, 2002 || Palomar || NEAT || — || align=right | 3.0 km || 
|-id=904 bgcolor=#E9E9E9
| 169904 ||  || — || September 15, 2002 || Haleakala || NEAT || — || align=right | 3.1 km || 
|-id=905 bgcolor=#E9E9E9
| 169905 ||  || — || September 14, 2002 || Palomar || NEAT || AGN || align=right | 1.8 km || 
|-id=906 bgcolor=#E9E9E9
| 169906 ||  || — || September 15, 2002 || Palomar || NEAT || — || align=right | 2.6 km || 
|-id=907 bgcolor=#E9E9E9
| 169907 ||  || — || September 14, 2002 || Palomar || R. Matson || HEN || align=right | 1.6 km || 
|-id=908 bgcolor=#E9E9E9
| 169908 ||  || — || September 12, 2002 || Palomar || R. Matson || MIS || align=right | 4.1 km || 
|-id=909 bgcolor=#E9E9E9
| 169909 ||  || — || September 14, 2002 || Palomar || R. Matson || — || align=right | 1.5 km || 
|-id=910 bgcolor=#E9E9E9
| 169910 ||  || — || September 1, 2002 || Palomar || NEAT || — || align=right | 3.4 km || 
|-id=911 bgcolor=#E9E9E9
| 169911 ||  || — || September 4, 2002 || Palomar || NEAT || — || align=right | 1.6 km || 
|-id=912 bgcolor=#d6d6d6
| 169912 ||  || — || September 4, 2002 || Palomar || NEAT || — || align=right | 2.8 km || 
|-id=913 bgcolor=#E9E9E9
| 169913 ||  || — || September 4, 2002 || Palomar || NEAT || — || align=right | 1.8 km || 
|-id=914 bgcolor=#E9E9E9
| 169914 ||  || — || September 26, 2002 || Haleakala || NEAT || — || align=right | 4.3 km || 
|-id=915 bgcolor=#d6d6d6
| 169915 ||  || — || September 27, 2002 || Palomar || NEAT || — || align=right | 3.8 km || 
|-id=916 bgcolor=#E9E9E9
| 169916 ||  || — || September 27, 2002 || Palomar || NEAT || — || align=right | 2.8 km || 
|-id=917 bgcolor=#fefefe
| 169917 ||  || — || September 27, 2002 || Palomar || NEAT || H || align=right | 1.1 km || 
|-id=918 bgcolor=#E9E9E9
| 169918 ||  || — || September 27, 2002 || Palomar || NEAT || — || align=right | 2.3 km || 
|-id=919 bgcolor=#d6d6d6
| 169919 ||  || — || September 27, 2002 || Palomar || NEAT || KOR || align=right | 2.0 km || 
|-id=920 bgcolor=#E9E9E9
| 169920 ||  || — || September 27, 2002 || Palomar || NEAT || DOR || align=right | 5.2 km || 
|-id=921 bgcolor=#E9E9E9
| 169921 ||  || — || September 27, 2002 || Palomar || NEAT || — || align=right | 4.0 km || 
|-id=922 bgcolor=#E9E9E9
| 169922 ||  || — || September 28, 2002 || Palomar || NEAT || — || align=right | 3.9 km || 
|-id=923 bgcolor=#E9E9E9
| 169923 ||  || — || September 26, 2002 || Palomar || NEAT || — || align=right | 2.2 km || 
|-id=924 bgcolor=#E9E9E9
| 169924 ||  || — || September 29, 2002 || Haleakala || NEAT || — || align=right | 3.7 km || 
|-id=925 bgcolor=#E9E9E9
| 169925 ||  || — || September 28, 2002 || Haleakala || NEAT || EUN || align=right | 2.3 km || 
|-id=926 bgcolor=#E9E9E9
| 169926 ||  || — || September 30, 2002 || Haleakala || NEAT || — || align=right | 3.0 km || 
|-id=927 bgcolor=#d6d6d6
| 169927 ||  || — || September 30, 2002 || Socorro || LINEAR || EOS || align=right | 2.8 km || 
|-id=928 bgcolor=#E9E9E9
| 169928 ||  || — || September 30, 2002 || Socorro || LINEAR || PAD || align=right | 3.2 km || 
|-id=929 bgcolor=#E9E9E9
| 169929 ||  || — || September 16, 2002 || Palomar || NEAT || AGN || align=right | 2.3 km || 
|-id=930 bgcolor=#E9E9E9
| 169930 ||  || — || October 1, 2002 || Haleakala || NEAT || HEN || align=right | 1.8 km || 
|-id=931 bgcolor=#E9E9E9
| 169931 ||  || — || October 1, 2002 || Kvistaberg || UDAS || JUN || align=right | 1.7 km || 
|-id=932 bgcolor=#E9E9E9
| 169932 ||  || — || October 1, 2002 || Anderson Mesa || LONEOS || — || align=right | 4.0 km || 
|-id=933 bgcolor=#E9E9E9
| 169933 ||  || — || October 1, 2002 || Anderson Mesa || LONEOS || HEN || align=right | 1.7 km || 
|-id=934 bgcolor=#E9E9E9
| 169934 ||  || — || October 2, 2002 || Socorro || LINEAR || — || align=right | 3.8 km || 
|-id=935 bgcolor=#E9E9E9
| 169935 ||  || — || October 2, 2002 || Socorro || LINEAR || AGN || align=right | 2.1 km || 
|-id=936 bgcolor=#d6d6d6
| 169936 ||  || — || October 2, 2002 || Socorro || LINEAR || KOR || align=right | 2.6 km || 
|-id=937 bgcolor=#d6d6d6
| 169937 ||  || — || October 2, 2002 || Socorro || LINEAR || — || align=right | 4.7 km || 
|-id=938 bgcolor=#d6d6d6
| 169938 ||  || — || October 2, 2002 || Socorro || LINEAR || LAU || align=right | 1.6 km || 
|-id=939 bgcolor=#E9E9E9
| 169939 ||  || — || October 2, 2002 || Socorro || LINEAR || — || align=right | 4.3 km || 
|-id=940 bgcolor=#E9E9E9
| 169940 ||  || — || October 2, 2002 || Socorro || LINEAR || WIT || align=right | 1.7 km || 
|-id=941 bgcolor=#d6d6d6
| 169941 ||  || — || October 2, 2002 || Socorro || LINEAR || — || align=right | 6.6 km || 
|-id=942 bgcolor=#d6d6d6
| 169942 ||  || — || October 2, 2002 || Socorro || LINEAR || LIX || align=right | 6.6 km || 
|-id=943 bgcolor=#d6d6d6
| 169943 ||  || — || October 2, 2002 || Socorro || LINEAR || — || align=right | 5.4 km || 
|-id=944 bgcolor=#d6d6d6
| 169944 ||  || — || October 2, 2002 || Socorro || LINEAR || — || align=right | 5.3 km || 
|-id=945 bgcolor=#d6d6d6
| 169945 ||  || — || October 2, 2002 || Socorro || LINEAR || — || align=right | 4.7 km || 
|-id=946 bgcolor=#E9E9E9
| 169946 ||  || — || October 2, 2002 || Socorro || LINEAR || — || align=right | 4.6 km || 
|-id=947 bgcolor=#E9E9E9
| 169947 ||  || — || October 2, 2002 || Socorro || LINEAR || — || align=right | 4.3 km || 
|-id=948 bgcolor=#E9E9E9
| 169948 ||  || — || October 3, 2002 || Campo Imperatore || CINEOS || — || align=right | 4.0 km || 
|-id=949 bgcolor=#d6d6d6
| 169949 ||  || — || October 4, 2002 || Socorro || LINEAR || EOS || align=right | 2.9 km || 
|-id=950 bgcolor=#E9E9E9
| 169950 ||  || — || October 3, 2002 || Socorro || LINEAR || — || align=right | 5.0 km || 
|-id=951 bgcolor=#E9E9E9
| 169951 ||  || — || October 8, 2002 || Socorro || LINEAR || — || align=right | 2.1 km || 
|-id=952 bgcolor=#d6d6d6
| 169952 ||  || — || October 3, 2002 || Palomar || NEAT || YAK || align=right | 3.3 km || 
|-id=953 bgcolor=#d6d6d6
| 169953 ||  || — || October 1, 2002 || Socorro || LINEAR || — || align=right | 3.7 km || 
|-id=954 bgcolor=#d6d6d6
| 169954 ||  || — || October 3, 2002 || Socorro || LINEAR || KOR || align=right | 2.2 km || 
|-id=955 bgcolor=#E9E9E9
| 169955 ||  || — || October 3, 2002 || Socorro || LINEAR || NEM || align=right | 3.8 km || 
|-id=956 bgcolor=#E9E9E9
| 169956 ||  || — || October 3, 2002 || Palomar || NEAT || ADE || align=right | 3.3 km || 
|-id=957 bgcolor=#d6d6d6
| 169957 ||  || — || October 3, 2002 || Socorro || LINEAR || CHA || align=right | 2.8 km || 
|-id=958 bgcolor=#E9E9E9
| 169958 ||  || — || October 4, 2002 || Socorro || LINEAR || — || align=right | 3.6 km || 
|-id=959 bgcolor=#E9E9E9
| 169959 ||  || — || October 3, 2002 || Palomar || NEAT || GEF || align=right | 2.2 km || 
|-id=960 bgcolor=#d6d6d6
| 169960 ||  || — || October 3, 2002 || Palomar || NEAT || — || align=right | 3.6 km || 
|-id=961 bgcolor=#d6d6d6
| 169961 ||  || — || October 3, 2002 || Palomar || NEAT || — || align=right | 4.9 km || 
|-id=962 bgcolor=#E9E9E9
| 169962 ||  || — || October 3, 2002 || Palomar || NEAT || — || align=right | 4.3 km || 
|-id=963 bgcolor=#E9E9E9
| 169963 ||  || — || October 4, 2002 || Palomar || NEAT || — || align=right | 4.7 km || 
|-id=964 bgcolor=#d6d6d6
| 169964 ||  || — || October 4, 2002 || Socorro || LINEAR || CHA || align=right | 4.2 km || 
|-id=965 bgcolor=#E9E9E9
| 169965 ||  || — || October 4, 2002 || Socorro || LINEAR || — || align=right | 4.5 km || 
|-id=966 bgcolor=#E9E9E9
| 169966 ||  || — || October 4, 2002 || Socorro || LINEAR || PAD || align=right | 4.5 km || 
|-id=967 bgcolor=#d6d6d6
| 169967 ||  || — || October 4, 2002 || Anderson Mesa || LONEOS || EOS || align=right | 4.7 km || 
|-id=968 bgcolor=#E9E9E9
| 169968 ||  || — || October 4, 2002 || Socorro || LINEAR || — || align=right | 2.7 km || 
|-id=969 bgcolor=#E9E9E9
| 169969 ||  || — || October 4, 2002 || Socorro || LINEAR || — || align=right | 2.4 km || 
|-id=970 bgcolor=#E9E9E9
| 169970 ||  || — || October 5, 2002 || Palomar || NEAT || — || align=right | 3.8 km || 
|-id=971 bgcolor=#E9E9E9
| 169971 ||  || — || October 3, 2002 || Socorro || LINEAR || — || align=right | 2.2 km || 
|-id=972 bgcolor=#E9E9E9
| 169972 ||  || — || October 3, 2002 || Palomar || NEAT || AER || align=right | 2.6 km || 
|-id=973 bgcolor=#E9E9E9
| 169973 ||  || — || October 4, 2002 || Anderson Mesa || LONEOS || INO || align=right | 2.8 km || 
|-id=974 bgcolor=#E9E9E9
| 169974 ||  || — || October 4, 2002 || Anderson Mesa || LONEOS || — || align=right | 4.7 km || 
|-id=975 bgcolor=#E9E9E9
| 169975 ||  || — || October 5, 2002 || Palomar || NEAT || — || align=right | 4.5 km || 
|-id=976 bgcolor=#d6d6d6
| 169976 ||  || — || October 4, 2002 || Socorro || LINEAR || HYG || align=right | 4.2 km || 
|-id=977 bgcolor=#d6d6d6
| 169977 ||  || — || October 4, 2002 || Socorro || LINEAR || BRA || align=right | 2.5 km || 
|-id=978 bgcolor=#E9E9E9
| 169978 ||  || — || October 5, 2002 || Anderson Mesa || LONEOS || — || align=right | 4.2 km || 
|-id=979 bgcolor=#E9E9E9
| 169979 ||  || — || October 5, 2002 || Anderson Mesa || LONEOS || — || align=right | 5.4 km || 
|-id=980 bgcolor=#E9E9E9
| 169980 ||  || — || October 3, 2002 || Socorro || LINEAR || — || align=right | 2.7 km || 
|-id=981 bgcolor=#d6d6d6
| 169981 ||  || — || October 4, 2002 || Socorro || LINEAR || — || align=right | 6.8 km || 
|-id=982 bgcolor=#d6d6d6
| 169982 ||  || — || October 9, 2002 || Bergisch Gladbach || W. Bickel || — || align=right | 3.9 km || 
|-id=983 bgcolor=#d6d6d6
| 169983 ||  || — || October 5, 2002 || Socorro || LINEAR || — || align=right | 6.1 km || 
|-id=984 bgcolor=#E9E9E9
| 169984 ||  || — || October 6, 2002 || Haleakala || NEAT || — || align=right | 3.9 km || 
|-id=985 bgcolor=#d6d6d6
| 169985 ||  || — || October 3, 2002 || Socorro || LINEAR || KOR || align=right | 2.1 km || 
|-id=986 bgcolor=#E9E9E9
| 169986 ||  || — || October 7, 2002 || Palomar || NEAT || — || align=right | 1.6 km || 
|-id=987 bgcolor=#E9E9E9
| 169987 ||  || — || October 5, 2002 || Socorro || LINEAR || — || align=right | 3.9 km || 
|-id=988 bgcolor=#d6d6d6
| 169988 ||  || — || October 5, 2002 || Socorro || LINEAR || — || align=right | 8.7 km || 
|-id=989 bgcolor=#E9E9E9
| 169989 ||  || — || October 6, 2002 || Socorro || LINEAR || — || align=right | 5.8 km || 
|-id=990 bgcolor=#d6d6d6
| 169990 ||  || — || October 7, 2002 || Socorro || LINEAR || — || align=right | 4.0 km || 
|-id=991 bgcolor=#d6d6d6
| 169991 ||  || — || October 7, 2002 || Haleakala || NEAT || — || align=right | 4.8 km || 
|-id=992 bgcolor=#E9E9E9
| 169992 ||  || — || October 10, 2002 || Kitt Peak || Spacewatch || PAD || align=right | 3.4 km || 
|-id=993 bgcolor=#d6d6d6
| 169993 ||  || — || October 7, 2002 || Palomar || NEAT || KOR || align=right | 2.0 km || 
|-id=994 bgcolor=#E9E9E9
| 169994 ||  || — || October 7, 2002 || Socorro || LINEAR || — || align=right | 2.9 km || 
|-id=995 bgcolor=#d6d6d6
| 169995 ||  || — || October 9, 2002 || Anderson Mesa || LONEOS || — || align=right | 2.9 km || 
|-id=996 bgcolor=#d6d6d6
| 169996 ||  || — || October 10, 2002 || Palomar || NEAT || KOR || align=right | 3.0 km || 
|-id=997 bgcolor=#E9E9E9
| 169997 ||  || — || October 10, 2002 || Socorro || LINEAR || — || align=right | 1.7 km || 
|-id=998 bgcolor=#d6d6d6
| 169998 ||  || — || October 10, 2002 || Socorro || LINEAR || — || align=right | 4.2 km || 
|-id=999 bgcolor=#E9E9E9
| 169999 ||  || — || October 9, 2002 || Socorro || LINEAR || — || align=right | 2.0 km || 
|-id=000 bgcolor=#E9E9E9
| 170000 ||  || — || October 10, 2002 || Socorro || LINEAR || — || align=right | 2.9 km || 
|}

References

External links 
 Discovery Circumstances: Numbered Minor Planets (165001)–(170000) (IAU Minor Planet Center)

0169